= Phoenixin =

Identifiers
- IUPAC name: (3S)-3-amino-4-[[(2S)-1-[[(2S)-5-amino-1-[(2S)-2-[(2S)-2-[[2-[[(2S)-1-[[(2S)-6-amino-1-[[(2S)-1-[[(2S)-1-[[(2S)-1-[[(2S)-1-[(2S)-2-[[(2S)-1-amino-1-oxo-3-phenylpropan-2-yl]carbamoyl]pyrrolidin-1-yl]-3-carboxy-1-oxopropan-2-yl]amino]-3-hydroxy-1-oxopropan-2-yl]amino]-3-(1H-indol-3-yl)-1-oxopropan-2-yl]amino]-3-methyl-1-oxobutan-2-yl]amino]-1-oxohexan-2-yl]amino]-4-methyl-1-oxopentan-2-yl]amino]-2-oxoethyl]carbamoyl]pyrrolidine-1-carbonyl]pyrrolidin-1-yl]-1,5-dioxopentan-2-yl]amino]-3-methyl-1-oxobutan-2-yl]amino]-4-oxobutanoic acid
- CAS Number: 1415039-79-0
- PubChem CID: 169450633

Chemical and physical data
- Formula: C_{75}H_{110}N_{18}O_{20}
- Molar mass: 1583.811 g·mol^{−1}
- 3D model (JSmol): Interactive image
- SMILES: CC(C)C[C@@H](C(=O)N[C@@H](CCCCN)C(=O)N[C@@H](C(C)C)C(=O)N[C@@H](CC1=CNC2=CC=CC=C21)C(=O)N[C@@H](CO)C(=O)N[C@@H](CC(=O)O)C(=O)N3CCC[C@H]3C(=O)N[C@@H](CC4=CC=CC=C4)C(=O)N)NC(=O)CNC(=O)[C@@H]5CCCN5C(=O)[C@@H]6CCCN6C(=O)[C@H](CCC(=O)N)NC(=O)[C@H](C(C)C)NC(=O)[C@H](CC(=O)O)N
- InChI: InChI=1S/C75H110N18O20/c1-39(2)31-50(82-58(96)37-81-69(107)54-22-14-29-92(54)75(113)56-24-16-30-93(56)73(111)48(25-26-57(78)95)84-71(109)61(40(3)4)89-64(102)45(77)34-59(97)98)66(104)83-47(21-12-13-27-76)65(103)90-62(41(5)6)72(110)86-51(33-43-36-80-46-20-11-10-19-44(43)46)67(105)88-53(38-94)68(106)87-52(35-60(99)100)74(112)91-28-15-23-55(91)70(108)85-49(63(79)101)32-42-17-8-7-9-18-42/h7-11,17-20,36,39-41,45,47-56,61-62,80,94H,12-16,21-35,37-38,76-77H2,1-6H3,(H2,78,95)(H2,79,101)(H,81,107)(H,82,96)(H,83,104)(H,84,109)(H,85,108)(H,86,110)(H,87,106)(H,88,105)(H,89,102)(H,90,103)(H,97,98)(H,99,100)/t45-,47-,48-,49-,50-,51-,52-,53-,54-,55-,56-,61-,62-/m0/s1; Key:WTUJETLCZZFKER-NLPGSOORSA-N

Phoenixin (PXE) is an endogenous neuropeptide derived by cleavage of the precursor protein SMIM20. It has two main forms, phoenixin-14 which has the sequence DVQPPGLKVWSDPF-NH2 or Asp-Val-Gln-Pro-Pro-Gly-Leu-Lys-Val-Trp-Ser-Asp-Pro-Phe-NH2, and phoenixin-20 which has an additional seven residues on the N-terminal end, but appears to have similar activity. A number of longer splice variants are known which are produced only in trace amounts. The amino acid sequence of phoenixin is highly conserved among mammals, and closely related peptides are found in more distantly related vertebrate species such as zebrafish, indicating that it is ancient in origin and likely has an important role. It appears to be the main endogenous ligand for the previously orphan receptor GPR173, and was initially assumed to be a reproductive hormone, as phoenixin mediated activation of GPR173 was found to modulate release of hormones such as gonadotropin releasing hormone (GnRH), luteinizing hormone and kisspeptin.

More recent research has found that as well as its role in reproductive function, phoenixin also appears to influence such diverse processes as cardiovascular function, feeding, memory, anxiety, stress, sensory perception, inflammation, mitochondrial function, oxidative stress responses, and cellular protection, and as well as GPR173 it appears to also act as an agonist at the GPR27 and GPR85 receptors. Altered levels of phoenexin are associated with medical conditions including chronic kidney disease and coronary artery disease, and phoenexin levels appear to be involved in the link between body weight and hormonal conditions such as polycystic ovary syndrome and precocious puberty. Phoenixin thus appears to have a number of different roles in the body, and research into its actions, regulation, and interaction with other neurotransmitter systems is ongoing.

== See also ==
- Galanin
- Neuropeptide FF
- Neuropeptide Y
- Orexin
