= SREB =

SREB may refer to:

- The Chinese Silk Road Economic Belt, a land-based trade initiative
- The Southern Regional Education Board in the USA
- The Southern Regional Examinations Board in the UK, incorporated into the Oxford, Cambridge and RSA Examinations Board (OCR)
- The Super Conserved Receptor Expressed in Brain family of G protein-coupled receptors
