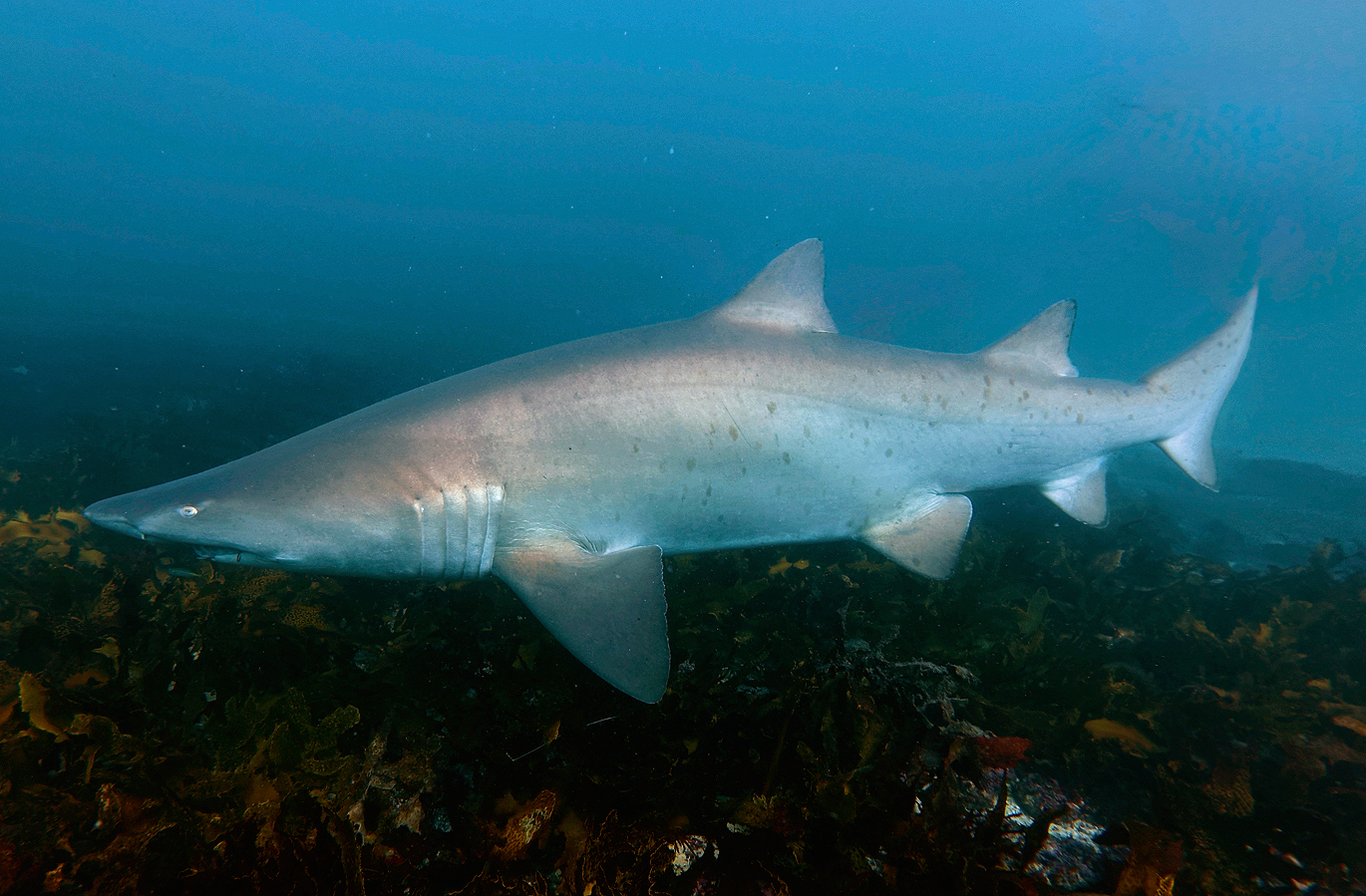
- Sand tiger shark off Cronulla, Australia

Conservation status
- Critically Endangered (IUCN 3.1)

Scientific classification
- Kingdom: Animalia
- Phylum: Chordata
- Class: Chondrichthyes
- Subclass: Elasmobranchii
- Division: Selachii
- Order: Lamniformes
- Family: Carchariidae
- Genus: Carcharias
- Species: C. taurus

Binomial name
- Carcharias taurus Rafinesque, 1810
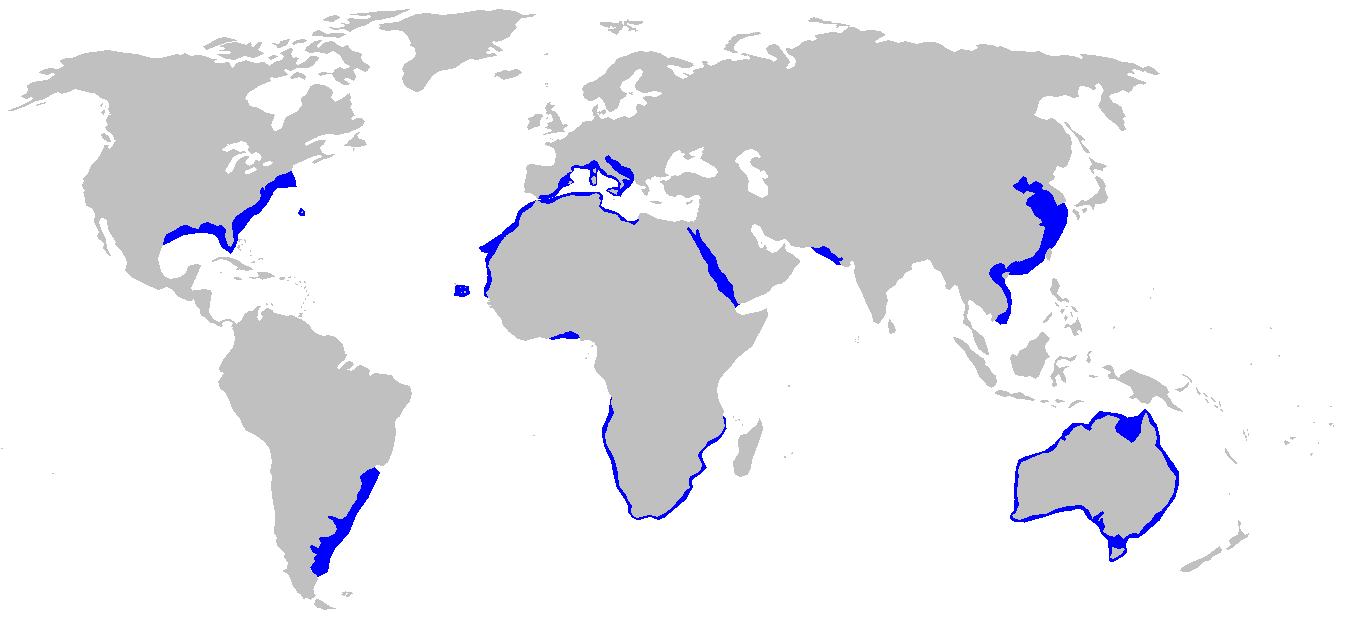
- Range of the sand tiger shark

Synonyms
- Carcharias tricuspidatus Day, 1878 Odontaspis taurus

= Sand tiger shark =

Species of shark

The sand tiger shark (Carcharias taurus), also commonly known as the spotted ragged-tooth shark in South Africa, grey nurse shark in Australia, or blue-nurse sand tiger in India, is a species of shark that inhabits subtropical and temperate waters worldwide. It inhabits the continental shelf, from sandy shorelines (hence the name sand tiger shark) and submerged reefs to a depth of around 191 m (627 ft). They dwell in the waters of East Asia, Australia, Western and Southern Africa, the Red sea, and the east coasts of North and South America. The sand tiger shark also inhabited the Mediterranean; however, it was last seen there in 2003 and is presumed extirpated. Despite its common names, it is not closely related to either the tiger shark (Galeocerdo cuvier) or the nurse shark (Ginglymostoma cirratum).

Despite its fearsome appearance and strong swimming ability, it is a relatively placid and slow-moving shark with no confirmed human fatalities. This species has a sharp, pointy head, and a bulky body. The sand tiger's length can reach 3.2 m (10.5 ft) but is normally 2.2–2.5 m in length. They are grey with reddish-brown spots on their backs. Shivers (groups) have been observed to hunt large schools of fish. Their diet consists of bony fish, crustaceans, squid, skates and other sharks. Unlike other sharks, the sand tiger can gulp air from the surface, allowing it to be suspended in the water column with minimal effort. During pregnancy, the most developed embryo will feed on its siblings, a reproductive strategy known as intrauterine cannibalism i.e. "embryophagy" or, more colorfully, adelphophagy—literally "eating one's brother". The sand tiger is categorized as critically endangered on the International Union for Conservation of Nature Red List. It is the most widely kept large shark in public aquariums owing to its tolerance for captivity.

== Taxonomy ==
The sand tiger shark's description as Carcharias taurus by Constantine Rafinesque came from a specimen caught off the coast of Sicily. Carcharias taurus means "bull shark". This taxonomic classification has been long disputed. Twenty-seven years after Rafinesque's original description the German biologists Müller and Henle changed the genus name from C. taurus to Triglochis taurus. The following year, Swiss-American naturalist Jean Louis Rodolphe Agassiz reclassified the shark as Odontaspis cuspidata based on examples of fossilized teeth. Agassiz's name was used until 1961 when three palaeontologists and ichthyologists, W. Tucker, E. I. White, and N. B. Marshall, requested that the shark be returned to the genus Carcharias. This request was rejected and Odontaspis was approved by the International Code of Zoological Nomenclature (ICZN). When experts concluded that taurus belongs after Odontaspis, the name was changed to Odontaspis taurus. In 1977, Compagno and Follet challenged the Odontaspis taurus name and substituted Eugomphodus, a somewhat unknown classification, for Odontaspis. Many taxonomists questioned his change, arguing that there was no significant difference between Odontaspis and Carcharias. After changing the name to Eugomphodus taurus, Compagno successfully advocated in establishing the shark's current scientific name as Carcharias taurus. The ICZN approved this name, and today it is used among biologists.

== Common names ==
Because the sand tiger shark is worldwide in distribution, it has many common names. The term "sand tiger shark" actually refers to four different sand tiger shark species in the family Odontaspididae. Furthermore, the name creates confusion with the unrelated tiger shark Galeocerdo cuvier. The grey nurse shark, the name used in Australia, is the second-most used name for the shark, and in India it is known as blue-nurse sand tiger. However, there are unrelated nurse sharks in the family Ginglymostomatidae. The most unambiguous and descriptive English name is probably the South African one, spotted ragged-tooth shark.

== Identification ==
There are four species referred to as sand tiger sharks:

1. The sand tiger shark Carcharias taurus
2. The Indian sand tiger shark Carcharias tricuspidatus. Very little is known about this species which, described before 1900, is probably the same as (a synonym of) the sand tiger C. taurus
3. The small-toothed sand tiger shark Odontaspis ferox. This species has a worldwide distribution, is seldom seen but normally inhabits deeper water than does C. taurus.
4. The Big-eyed sand tiger shark Odontaspis noronhai, a deep water shark of the Americas, of which little is known.

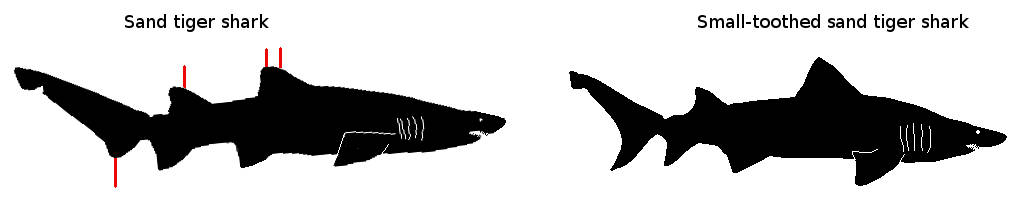
Diagram indicating the differences between C. taurus and O. ferox

The most likely problem when identifying the sand tiger shark is when in the presence of either of the two species of Odontaspis. The sand tiger is usually spotted, especially on the hind half of the body. However, there are several other differences that are probably more reliable:

1. The bottom part of the caudal fin (tail fin) of the sand tiger is smaller.
2. The second (i.e., hind) dorsal fin of the sand tiger is almost as large as the first (i.e., front) dorsal fin.
3. The first (i.e., front) dorsal fin of the sand tiger is relatively non-symmetric.
4. The first (i.e., front) dorsal fin of the sand tiger is closer to the pelvic fin than to the pectoral fin (i.e., the first dorsal fin is positioned further backwards in the case of the sand tiger).

== Description ==
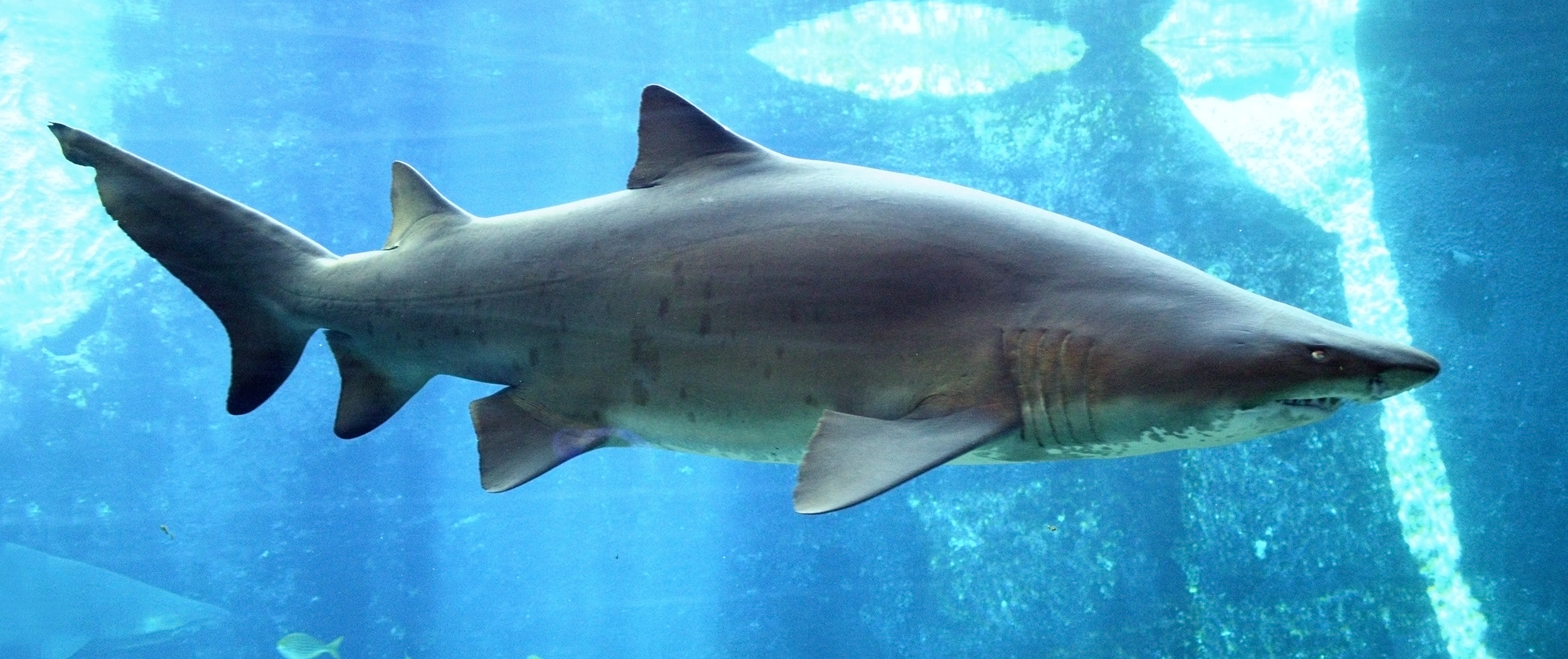
At UShaka Sea World

Adult sand tigers range from 2 m (6.6 ft) to 3.2 m (10.5 ft) in length with most specimens reaching a length of around 2.2–2.5 m and 91 kg (201 lb) to 159 kg (351 lb) in weight. The head is pointy, as opposed to round, while the snout is flattened with a conical shape. Its body is stout and bulky and its mouth extends beyond the eyes. The eyes of the sand tiger shark are small, lacking eyelids. A sand tiger usually swims with its mouth open displaying three rows of protruding, smooth-edged, sharp-pointed teeth. The males have grey claspers with white tips located on the underside of their body. The caudal fin is elongated with a long upper lobe (i.e. strongly heterocercal). They have two large, broad-based grey dorsal fins set back beyond the pectoral fins. The sand tiger shark has a grey-brown back and pale underside. Adults tend to have reddish-brown spots scattered, mostly on the hind part of the body. In August 2007, an albino specimen was photographed off South West Rocks, Australia. The teeth of these sharks have no transverse serrations (as have many other sharks) but they have a large, smooth main cusp with a tiny cusplet on each side of the main cusp. The upper front teeth are separated from the teeth on the side of the mouth by small intermediate teeth.

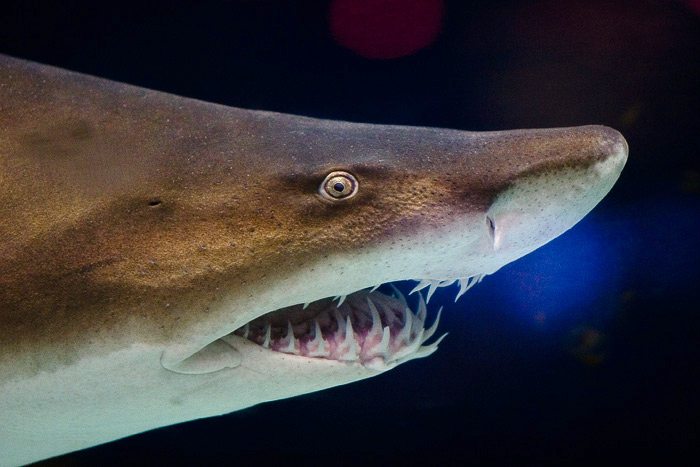
Snout and mouth of sand tiger shark, showing protruding teeth and small eyes

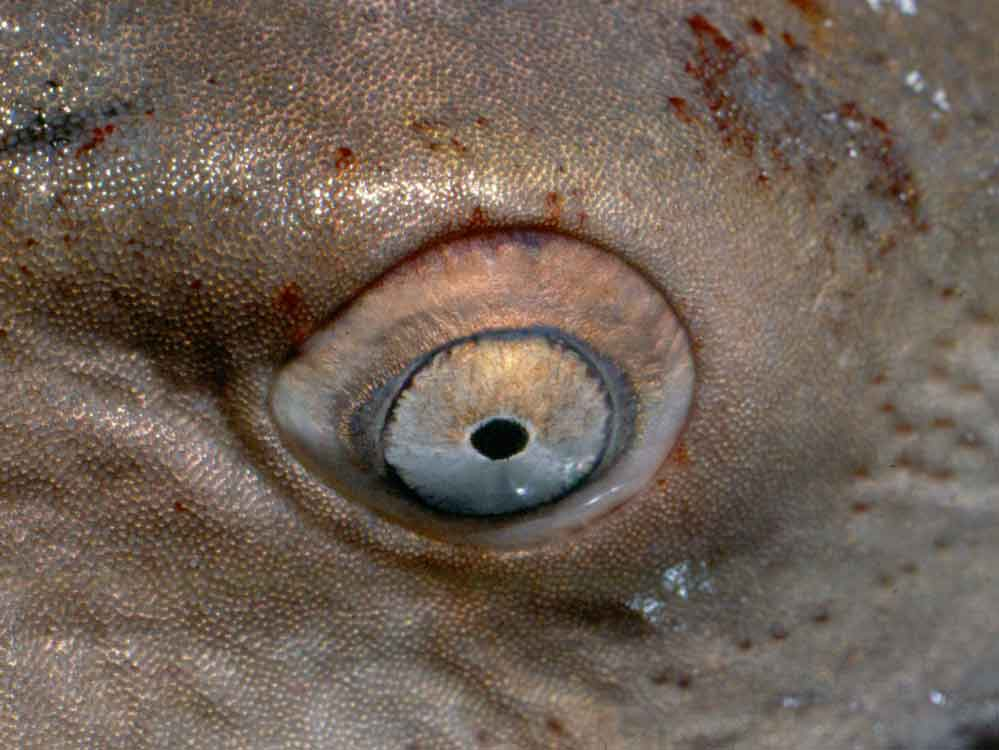
Eye

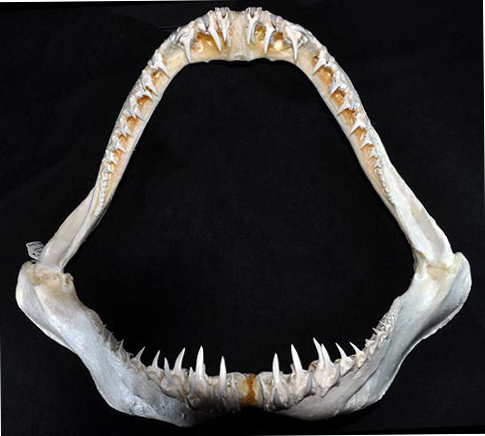
Jaws

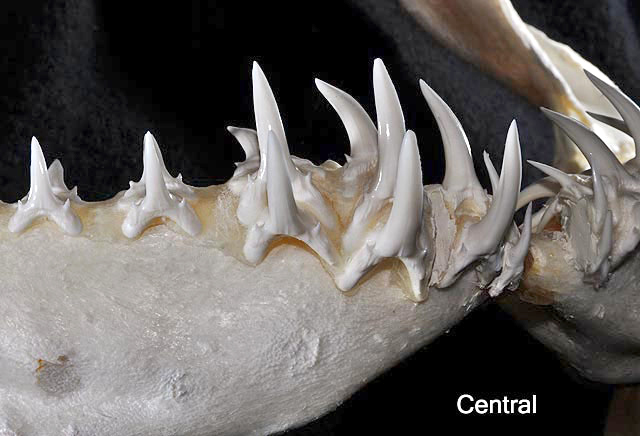
Central teeth

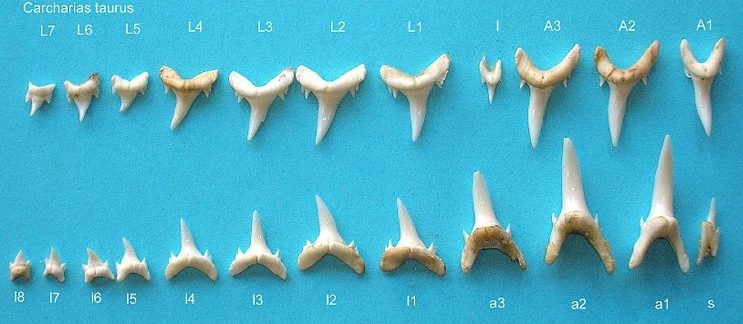
Individual teeth

== Habitat and range ==
=== Geographical range ===
Sand tiger sharks roam the epipelagic and mesopelagic regions of the ocean, sandy coastal waters, estuaries, shallow bays, and rocky or tropical reefs, at depths of up to 190 m (623 ft).

The sand tiger shark can be found in the Atlantic, Pacific and Indian Oceans, and in the Adriatic Seas. In the Western Atlantic Ocean, it is found in coastal waters around from the Gulf of Maine to Florida, in the northern Gulf of Mexico, around the Bahamas and Bermuda, and from southern Brazil to northern Argentina. It is also found in the eastern Atlantic Ocean from the Mediterranean Sea to the Canary Islands, at the Cape Verde islands, along the coasts of Senegal and Ghana, and from southern Nigeria to Cameroon. In the western Indian Ocean, the shark ranges from South Africa to southern Mozambique, but excluding Madagascar. The sand tiger shark has also been sighted in the Red Sea and may be found as far east as India. In the western Pacific, it has been sighted in the waters around the coasts of Japan and Australia, but not around New Zealand.

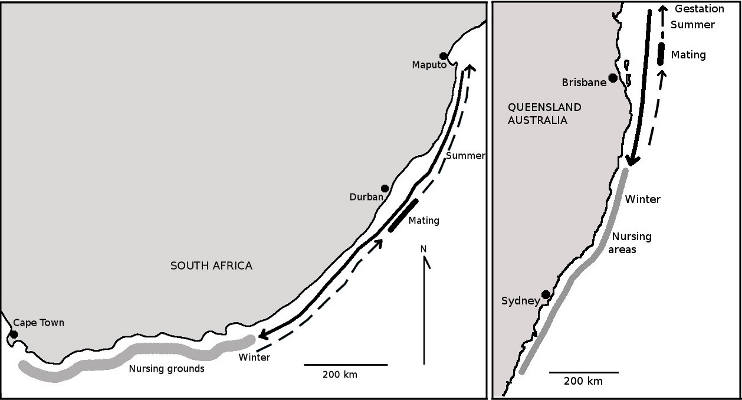
Annual movements of sand tiger sharks off South Africa and Australia

=== Annual migration ===
Sand tigers in South Africa and Australia undertake an annual migration that may cover more than 1,000 km (620 mi). They pup during the summer in relatively cold water (temperature ca. 16 °C [61 °F]). After parturition, they swim northwards toward sites where there are suitable rocks or caves, often at a water depth ca. 20 m (66 ft), where they mate during and just after the winter. Mating normally takes place at night. After mating, they swim further north to even warmer water where gestation takes place. In autumn they return southwards to give birth in cooler water. This round trip may encompass as much as 3,000 km (1,900 mi). The young sharks do not take part in this migration, but they are absent from the normal birth grounds during winter: it is thought that they move deeper into the ocean. At Cape Cod (USA), juveniles move away from coastal areas when water temperatures fall below 16 °C and day length decreases to less than 12 h. Juveniles, however, return to their usual summer haunts and as they become mature they start larger migratory movements.

== Behavior ==
=== Hunting ===
The sand tiger shark is a nocturnal feeder. During the day, they take shelter near rocks, overhangs, caves and reefs often at relatively shallow depths (<20 m). This is the typical environment where divers encounter sand tigers, hovering just above the bottom in large sandy gutters and caves. However, at night they leave the shelter and hunt over the ocean bottom, often ranging far from their shelter. Sand tigers hunt by stealth. It is the only shark known to gulp air and store it in the stomach, allowing the shark to maintain near-neutral buoyancy which helps it to hunt motionlessly and quietly. Aquarium observations indicate that when it comes close enough to a prey item, it grabs with a quick sideways snap of the prey. The sand tiger shark has been observed to gather in hunting groups when preying upon large schools of fish.

=== Diet ===
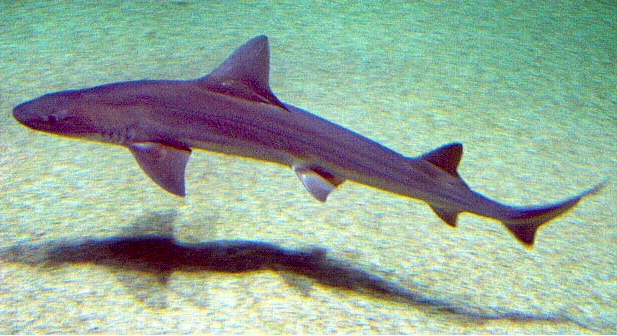
A bottom-living smooth-hound shark, one of the important prey items of sand tiger sharks

The majority of prey items of sand tigers are demersal (i.e. from the sea bottom), suggesting that they hunt extensively on the sea bottom as far out as the continental shelf. Their diet consists mainly of teleosts and other elasmobranchs. Bony fish (teleosts) form about 60% of sand tigers' food, the remaining prey being sharks, skates, other rays, lobsters, crabs and squid. In Argentina, the prey includes mostly demersal fishes, e.g. the striped weakfish (Cynoscion guatucupa) and whitemouth croaker (Micropogonias furnieri). The most important elasmobranch prey is the bottom-living narrownose smooth-hound shark (Mustelus schmitti.). Benthic (i.e. free-swimming) rays and skates are also taken, including fanskates, eagle rays and the angular angel shark, with larger individuals feeding on a higher number of benthic elasmobranchs than smaller individuals. Stomach content analysis indicates that smaller sand tigers mainly focus on the sea bottom and as they grow larger they start to take more pelagic prey. This perspective of the diet of sand tigers is consistent with similar observations in the north west Atlantic and in South Africa where large sand tigers capture a wider range of shark and skate species as prey, from the surf zone to the continental shelf, indicating the opportunistic nature of sand tiger feeding. Off South Africa, sand tigers less than 2 m (6.6 ft) in length prey on fish about a quarter of their own length; however, large sand tigers capture prey up to about half of their own length. The prey items are usually swallowed as three or four chunks.

=== Courtship and mating ===
Mating occurs around the months of August and December in the northern hemisphere and during August–October in the southern hemisphere. The courtship and mating of sand tigers has been best documented from observations in large aquaria. In Oceanworld, Sydney, the females tended to hover just above the sandy bottom ("shielding") when they were receptive. This prevented males from approaching from underneath towards their cloaca. Often there is more than one male close by with the dominant one remaining close to the female, intimidating others with an aggressive display in which the dominant shark closely follows the tail of the subordinate, forcing the subordinate to accelerate and swim away. The dominant male snaps at smaller fish of other species. The male approaches the female and the two sharks protect the sandy bottom over which they interact. Strong interest of the male is indicated by superficial bites in the anal and pectoral fin areas of the female. The female responds with superficial biting of the male. This behaviour continues for several days during which the male patrols the area around the female. The male regularly approaches the female in "nosing" behaviour to "smell" the cloaca of the female. If she is ready, she swims off with the male, while both partners contort their bodies so that the right clasper of the male enters the cloaca of the female. The male bites the base of her right pectoral fin, leaving scars that are easily visible afterwards. After one or two minutes, mating is complete and the two separate. Females often mate with more than one male. Females mate only every second or third year. After mating, the females remain behind, while the males move off to seek other areas to feed, resulting in many observations of sand tiger populations comprising almost exclusively females.

== Reproduction and growth ==
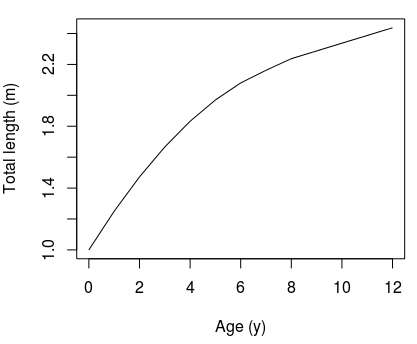
Growth curve for sand tiger sharks in the north Atlantic

=== Reproduction ===
The reproductive pattern is similar to that of many of the Odontaspididae, the shark family to which sand tigers belong. Female sand tigers have two uterine horns that, during early embryonic development, may have as many as 50 embryos that obtain nutrients from their yolk sacs and possibly consume uterine fluids. When one of the embryos reaches some 10 cm (4 in) in length, it eats all the smaller embryos so that only one large embryo remains in each uterine horn, a process called intrauterine cannibalism i.e. "embryophagy" or, more colorfully, adelphophagy—literally "eating one's brother." While multiple male sand tigers commonly fertilize a single female, adelphophagy sometimes excludes all but one of them from gaining offspring. These surviving embryos continue to feed on a steady supply of unfertilised eggs. After a lengthy labour, the female gives birth to 1 m (3.3 ft) long, fully independent offspring. The gestation period is approximately eight to twelve months. These sharks give birth only every second or third year, resulting in an overall mean reproductive rate of less than one pup per year, one of the lowest reproductive rates for sharks.

=== Growth ===
In the north Atlantic, sand tiger sharks are born about 1 m in length. During the first year, they grow about 27 cm to reach 1.3 m. After that, the growth rate decreases by about 2.5 cm each year until it stabilises at about 7 cm/y. Males reach sexual maturity at an age of five to seven years and approximately 1.9 m (6.2 ft) in length. Females reach maturity when approximately 2.2 m (7.2 ft) long at about seven to ten years of age. They are normally not expected to reach lengths over 3 m and lengths around 2.2–2.5 is more common. In the informal media, such as YouTube, there have been several reports of sand tigers around 5 m long, but none of these have been verified scientifically.

== Interaction with humans ==
=== Attacks on humans ===
As of 2023, the Florida Museum's International Shark Attack File lists 36 unprovoked, non-fatal attacks by sand tiger sharks.

Over the weekend of 4 July 2023, there were four attacks attributed to sand tiger sharks off the coast of Long Island, New York, USA. This followed a recent spike in shark attacks in New York state, with 13 incidents reported over a two-year period.

=== Nets around swimming beaches ===
In Australia and South Africa, one of the common practices in beach holiday areas is to erect shark nets around the beaches frequently used by swimmers. These nets are erected some 400 m (1,300 ft) from the shore and act as gill nets that trap incoming sharks: this was the norm until about 2005. In South Africa, the mortality of sand tiger sharks caused a significant decrease in the length of these animals and it was concluded that the shark nets pose a significant threat to this species with its very low reproductive rate Before 2000, these nets snagged about 200 sand tiger sharks per year in South Africa, of which only about 40% survived and were released alive. The efficiency of shark nets for the prevention of unprovoked shark attacks on bathers has been questioned, and since 2000 there has been a reduced use of these nets and alternative approaches are being developed.

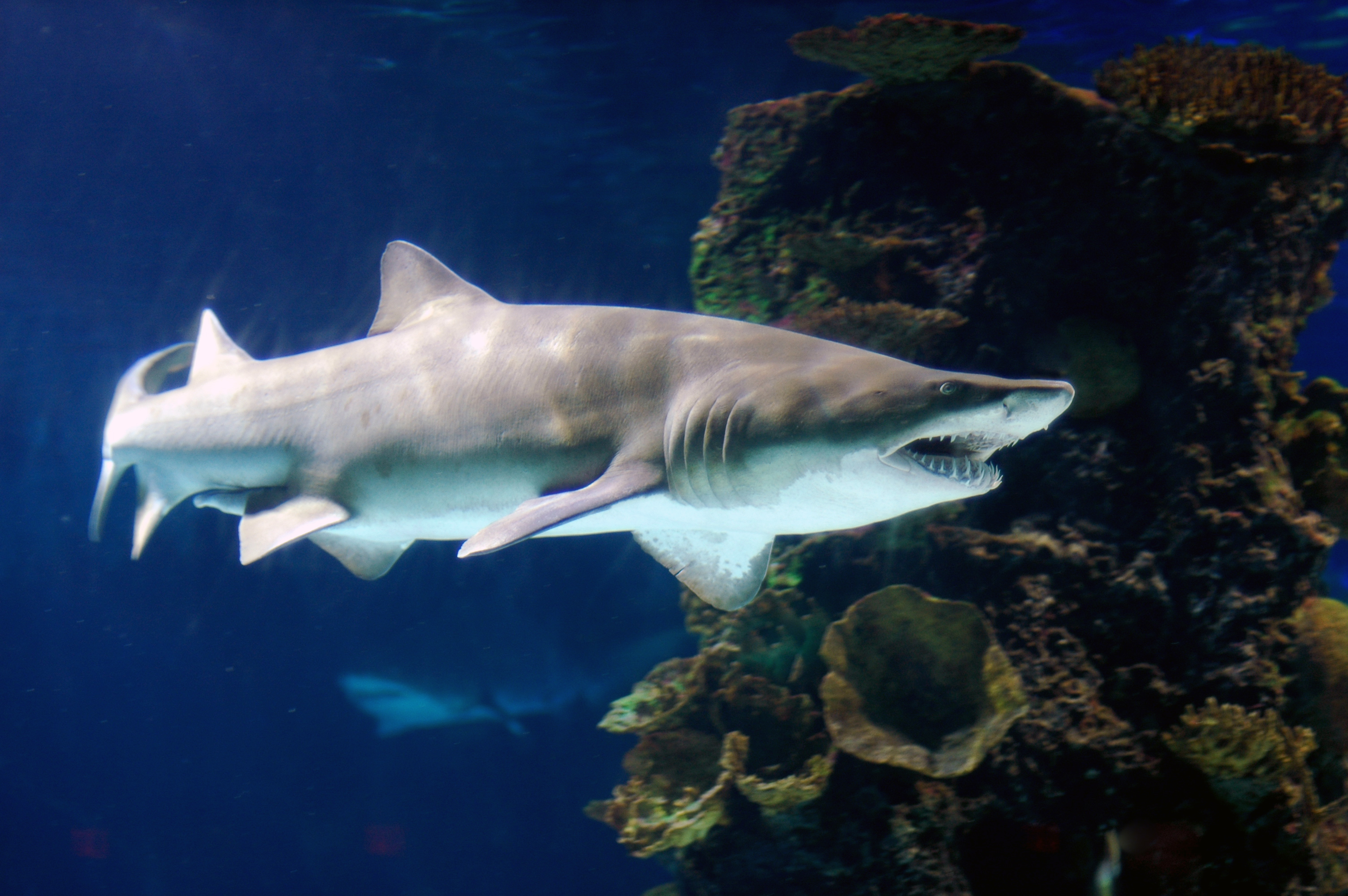
Sand tiger shark in the Newport Aquarium

=== Competition for food with humans ===
In Argentina, the prey items of sand tigers largely coincided with important commercial fisheries targets. Humans affect sand tiger food availability and the sharks, in turn, compete with humans for food that, in turn, has already been heavily exploited by the fisheries industry. The same applies to the bottom-living sea catfish (Galeichthys feliceps), a fisheries resource off the South African coast.

=== Effects of scuba divers ===
A study near Sydney in Australia found that the behaviour of the sharks is affected by the proximity of scuba divers. Diver activity affects the aggregation, swimming and respiratory behaviour of sharks, but only at short time scales. The group size of scuba divers was less important in affecting sand tiger behaviour than the distance within which they approached the sharks. Divers approaching to within 3 m of sharks affected their behaviour but after the divers had retreated, the sharks resumed normal behaviour. Other studies indicate sand tiger sharks can be indifferent to divers. Scuba divers are normally compliant with Australian shark-diving regulations.

=== In captivity ===
Its large and menacing appearance, combined with its relative placidity, has made the sand tiger shark among the most popular shark species to be displayed in public aquaria. However, as with all large sharks, keeping them in captivity is not without its difficulties. Sand tiger sharks have been found to be highly susceptible to developing spinal deformities, with as many as one in every three captive sharks being affected, giving them a hunched appearance. These deformities have been hypothesized to be correlated to both the size and shape of their tank. If the tank is too small, the sharks have to spend more time actively swimming than they would in the wild, where they have space to glide. Also, sharks in small, circular tanks often spend most of their time circling along the edges in only one direction, causing asymmetrical stress on their bodies.

== Threats and conservation status ==
=== Threats ===
There are several factors contributing to the decline in the population of the sand tigers. Sand tigers reproduce at an unusually low rate, due to the fact that they do not have more than two pups at a time and because they breed only every second or third year. This shark is a highly prized food item in the western northern Pacific, off Ghana and off India and Pakistan where they are caught by fishing trawlers, although they are more commonly caught with a fishing line. Sand tigers' fins are a popular trade item in Japan. Off North America, it is fished for its hide and fins. Shark liver oil is a popular product in cosmetic products such as lipstick. It is sought by anglers in fishing competitions in South Africa and some other countries. In Australia it has been reduced in numbers by spear fishers using poison and where it is now protected. It is also prized as an aquarium exhibit in the United States, Europe, Australia and South Africa because of its docile and hardy nature. Thus, overfishing is a major contributor to the population decline. All indications show that the world population in sand tigers has been reduced significantly in size since 1980. Many sand tigers are caught in shark nets, and then either strangled or taken by fishermen. Estuaries along the United States of America's eastern Atlantic coast houses many of the young sand tiger sharks. These estuaries are susceptible to non-point source pollution that is harmful to the pups. In Eastern Australia, the breeding population was estimated to be fewer than 400 reproductively mature animals, a number believed to be too small to sustain a healthy population.

=== Conservation status ===
This species is therefore listed as Critically Endangered on the International Union for Conservation of Nature Red List, and as endangered under Queensland's Nature Conservation Act 1992. It is a U.S. National Marine Fisheries Service [Species of Concern], which are those species that the U.S. Government's National Oceanic and Atmospheric Administration, National Marine Fisheries Service (NMFS), has some concerns regarding status and threats, but for which insufficient information is available to indicate a need to list the species under the U.S. Endangered Species Act. According to the National Marine Fisheries Service, any shark caught must be released immediately with minimal harm, and is considered a prohibited species, making it illegal to harvest any part of the sand tiger shark on the United States' Atlantic coast.

A recent report from the Pew Charitable Trusts suggests that a new management approach used for large mammals that have suffered population declines could hold promise for sharks. Because of the life-history characteristics of sharks, conventional fisheries management approaches, such as reaching maximum sustainable yield, may not be sufficient to rebuild depleted shark populations. Some of the more stringent approaches used to reverse declines in large mammals may be appropriate for sharks, including prohibitions on the retention of the most vulnerable species and regulation of international trade.

== Bibliography ==
- Parker, Steve; Parker, Jane (2002). "Design for Living". The Encyclopedia of Sharks. Firefly Books. p. 100.
