= Nerve cord =

Nervous system of a generic bilaterian animal, in the form of a nerve cord with segmental enlargements, and a "brain" at the front

In some bilaterian animals, the nerve cord, which runs from the head to the tail, forms a main part of the central nervous system. Depending on their location they are classified as:

- Dorsal nerve cord, in chordates
- Ventral nerve cord, in some invertebrates

Some bilaterians have no nerve cords while others have more than one nerve cord; for example, both nerve cords are present in hemichordates. The two types of cords need not be singular: Platyhelminthes have two ventral nerve cords. Different lineages evolved nerve cord structures independently from an ancestral nerve net using a similar set of transcription factors across the lineages.
