= Spiral valve =

Part of a shark intestine

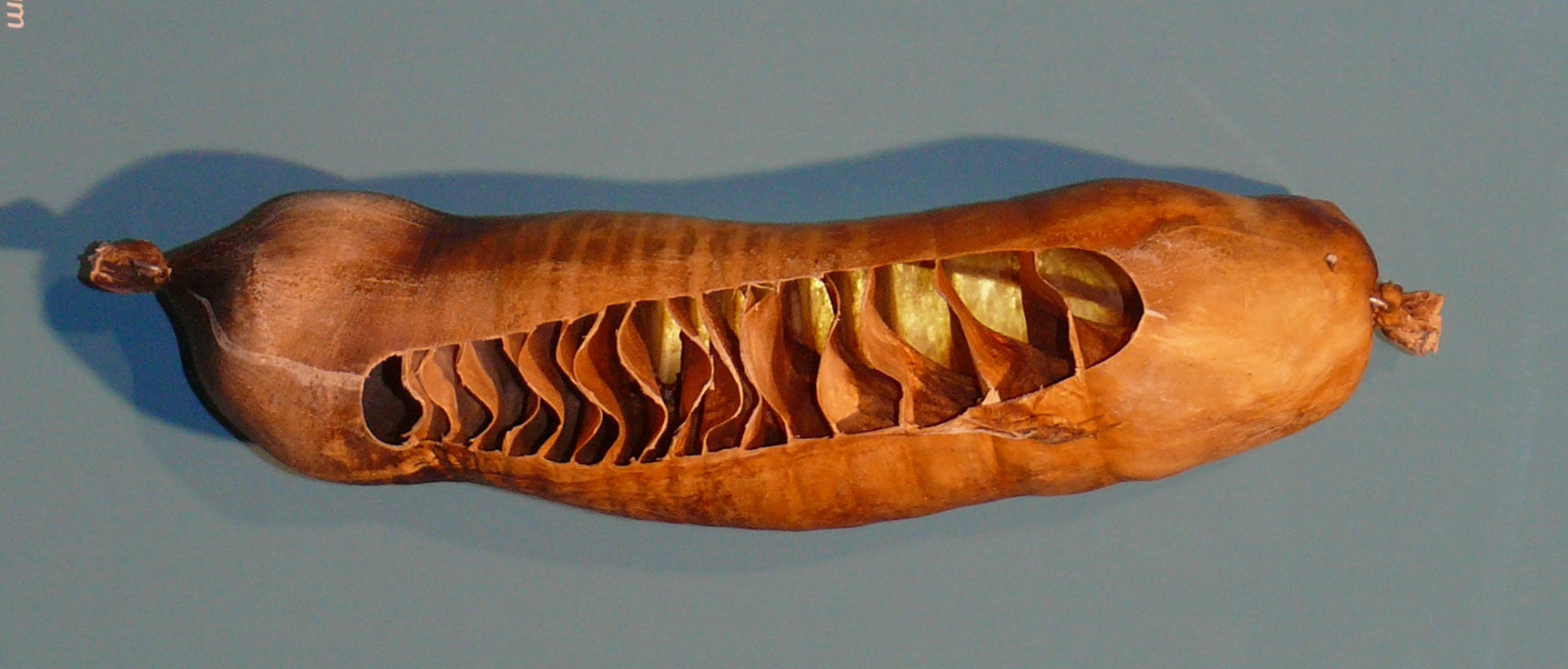
The spiral valve of a nurse shark (Ginglymostoma cirratum).

A spiral valve or scroll valve is the corkscrew-shaped lower portion of the intestine of some sharks, Acipenseriformes (sturgeon and paddlefish), rays, skates, bichirs, Lepisosteiformes (gars), and lungfishes. A modification of the ileum, the spiral valve is internally twisted or coiled to increase the surface area of the intestine which increases nutrient absorption.

== Description ==
The intestines of a shark are much shorter than those of mammals. Sharks have compensated for this problem by having a spiral valve, or a scroll valve, inside the intestine to increase the absorbent surface of the intestine. By keeping digestible material in the ileum for an extended period maximum nutrient absorption is ensured. For this reason, many sharks and related fish feed very infrequently. The food passes into the comparatively short colon of the shark almost fully digested, and then out the cloaca and vent.

A consequence of the spiral valve constricting the lumen of the ileum is that sharks cannot pass large hard objects (such as bones) through their lower intestine. Such objects instead remain in the stomach until sufficiently broken down for passing through the valve region, or are regurgitated. Consequently, shark stomachs often contain items of interest that enable one to determine what the animals feed on, as well as non-food items ingested during a feeding frenzy.

Sharks also possess a rectal gland that removes excess salt.

== Applications ==
The spiral valve has been analogized to a Tesla valve. Researchers in biomimetics have used a design inspired by the spiral valve to create a soft pipe with no moving parts, in which fluid is more likely to flow one way than the other. The softness is necessary, as there is a mathematical theorem stating that in a completely undeformable pipe, fluid is equally likely to flow forwards or backwards.

== See also ==
- Small intestine
- Physical characteristics of sharks
