= Obestatin =

Hormone that is produced in the stomach

ghrelin/obestatin preprohormone
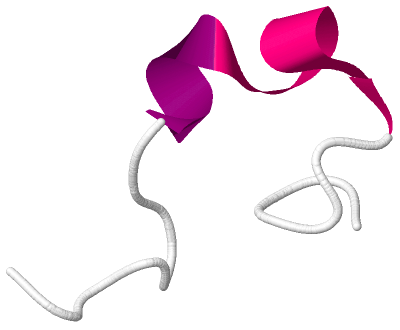
- Obestatin NMR structure in SDS / DPC micellar solution.

Identifiers
- Symbol: GHRL
- NCBI gene: 51738
- HGNC: 18129
- OMIM: 605353
- RefSeq: NM_016362
- UniProt: Q9UBU3

Other data
- Locus: Chr. 3 p26-p25
Search for
- Structures: Swiss-model
- Domains: InterPro

Obestatin is a hormone that is produced in specialized epithelial cells of the stomach and small intestine of several animals including humans. Obestatin was originally identified as an anorectic peptide, but its effect on food intake remains controversial.

== Discovery ==
Obestatin was discovered using a bioinformatics approach: by computer search of the sequenced genomes of several organisms.

== Structure ==
The obestatin structure to the right was determined by NMR. The length of the polypeptide was found to be 24 residues with a secondary structure 29% helical. Specifically 2 helices and 7 residues are formed.

== Gene and transcription ==
Obestatin is encoded by the same gene that encodes ghrelin, a peptide hormone. The mRNA produced from the GHRL gene has four exons. Five products of similar structure and function arise: the first is the 117-amino acid preproghrelin. (It is homologous to promotilin; both are members of the motilin family). It is cleaved to produce proghrelin which is cleaved to produce a 28-amino acid ghrelin (unacylated) and C-ghrelin(acylated). Obestatin is presumed to be cleaved from C-ghrelin.

== Receptor ==
It was originally proposed that GPR39 functioned as an obestatin receptor, however more recent findings suggest that this is unlikely.

== Blood levels ==
As yet no biochemical studies of circulating obestatin have been carried out.

== Function ==
Obestatin opposes the actions of ghrelin which are growth hormone secretion and increased appetite. The purpose of producing two hormones with opposing effects is not clear: removing the ghrelin gene from mice did not significantly reduce food intake. No secretory convertase is capable of cleaving the recombinant proghrelin precursor by cleavage at the single basic residue required for generation of the obestatin sequence. Thus the physiological generation of this particular peptide sequence remains unproven. Obestatin has opposite action to ghrelin on food intake and plays a role in energy balance. Circuit-resistance exercise resulted in a significant change in GH levels, but had no effect on plasma Obestatin levels.

== Clinical significance ==
Studies on the obestatin/ghrelin ratio in the gastrointestinal tract and plasma are associated with some diseases such as irritable bowel syndrome (IBS), obesity, Prader–Willi syndrome, and type II diabetes mellitus.

== See also ==
- Ghrelin
- Nesfatin-1
