= NDN (gene) =

Protein-coding gene in the species Homo sapiens

Identifiers
- Aliases: NDN, HsT16328, PWCR, necdin, MAGE family member
- External IDs: OMIM: 602117; MGI: 97290; GeneCards: NDN

Gene location (Human)
Chr.	Chromosome 15 (human)
Band	15q11.2	Start	23,685,400 bp
Band	15q11.2	End	23,687,305 bp

Gene location (Mouse)
Chr.	Chromosome 7 (mouse)
Band	7 34.36 cM|7 C	Start	61,996,317 bp
Band	7 34.36 cM|7 C	End	62,000,010 bp
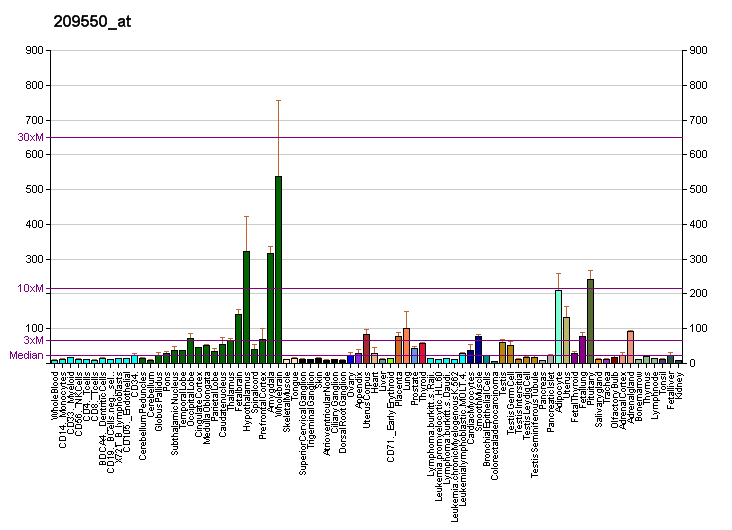
RNA expression pattern
Bgee	Human / Mouse (ortholog); Top expressed in: endothelial cell; tendon of biceps brachii; internal globus pallidus; canal of the cervix; nucleus accumbens; right ovary; hypothalamus; left ovary; urethra; parietal pleura / Top expressed in: dorsomedial hypothalamic nucleus; median eminence; arcuate nucleus; ventromedial nucleus; paraventricular nucleus of hypothalamus; superior cervical ganglion; suprachiasmatic nucleus; lateral hypothalamus; supraoptic nucleus; ventral tegmental area; More reference expression data
BioGPS	More reference expression data
Gene ontology
Molecular function	DNA binding; DNA-binding transcription activator activity, RNA polymerase II-specific; RNA polymerase II cis-regulatory region sequence-specific DNA binding; gamma-tubulin binding
Cellular component	cytoplasm; perikaryon; centrosome; cell projection; nucleus; nucleoplasm; cytosol
Biological process	respiratory system process; genomic imprinting; neurotrophin TRK receptor signaling pathway; regulation of transcription, DNA-templated; axonogenesis; neuron development; neuron migration; multicellular organismal homeostasis; transcription by RNA polymerase II; post-embryonic development; transcription, DNA-templated; nervous system development; respiratory gaseous exchange by respiratory system; central nervous system development; axon extension; sensory perception of pain; regulation of growth; axonal fasciculation; positive regulation of transcription by RNA polymerase II; negative regulation of cell population proliferation; glial cell migration; cytokine-mediated signaling pathway
Sources:Amigo / QuickGO
Orthologs
Databases	NCBI: entry; OMA: entry
Species	Human	Mouse
Entrez	4692	17984
Ensembl	ENSG00000182636; ENSG00000288364	ENSMUSG00000033585
UniProt	Q99608	P25233
RefSeq (mRNA)	NM_002487	NM_010882
RefSeq (protein)	NP_002478	NP_035012
Location (UCSC)	Chr 15: 23.69 – 23.69 Mb	Chr 7: 62 – 62 Mb
PubMed search
- Wikidata
View/Edit Human	View/Edit Mouse

Necdin is a protein that in humans is encoded by the NDN gene.

== Function ==
This intronless gene is located in the Prader–Willi syndrome (PWS) deletion region. It is an imprinted gene and is expressed exclusively from the paternal allele. Studies in mice suggest that the protein encoded by this gene may suppress growth in postmitotic neurons.

Necdin is used to stimulate growth regulation and DNA-dependent transcription regulation.

== Interactions ==
NDN (gene) has been shown to interact with:

- E2F1,
- HNRNPU,
- IL1A,
- Low affinity nerve growth factor receptor,
- NUCB2, and
- P53
