= GPR173 =

Protein-coding gene in humans

Identifiers
- Aliases: GPR173, SREB3, G protein-coupled receptor 173
- External IDs: OMIM: 300253; MGI: 1918021; GeneCards: GPR173

Gene location (Human)
| Chr. | X chromosome (human) |
| Band | Xp11.22 | Start | 53,048,789 bp |
| Band | Xp11.22 | End | 53,080,615 bp |

Gene location (Mouse)
| Chr. | X chromosome (mouse) |
| Band | X|X F3 | Start | 151,126,594 bp |
| Band | X|X F3 | End | 151,151,700 bp |
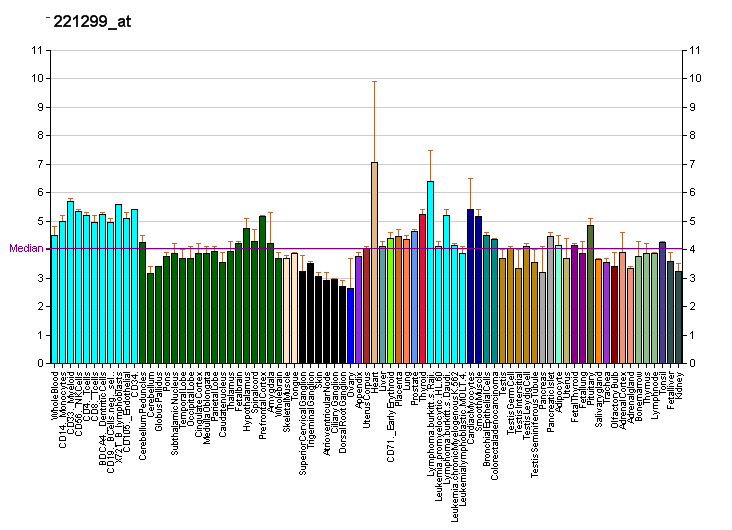
RNA expression pattern
| Bgee | Human / Mouse (ortholog); Top expressed in: ganglionic eminence; anterior pituitary; right hemisphere of cerebellum; ventricular zone; tibial nerve; right ovary; left ovary; right frontal lobe; nucleus accumbens; anterior cingulate cortex / Top expressed in: lumbar spinal ganglion; trigeminal ganglion; Rostral migratory stream; ventricular zone; autonomic nervous system; ganglionic eminence; sympathetic ganglion; paravertebral ganglia; midgut; medial ganglionic eminence; More reference expression data |
| BioGPS | More reference expression data |
Gene ontology
| Molecular function | signal transducer activity; G protein-coupled receptor activity; gonadotropin-releasing hormone receptor activity |
| Cellular component | integral component of membrane; membrane; plasma membrane |
| Biological process | G protein-coupled receptor signaling pathway; negative regulation of neuron migration; cellular response to gonadotropin-releasing hormone; signal transduction |
Sources:Amigo / QuickGO
Orthologs
| Databases | NCBI: entry; OMA: entry |
| Species | Human | Mouse |
| Entrez | 54328 | 70771 |
| Ensembl | ENSG00000184194 | ENSMUSG00000056679 |
| UniProt | Q9NS66 | Q6PI62 |
| RefSeq (mRNA) | NM_018969 | NM_027543; NM_001313748; NM_001359449; NM_001359450 |
| RefSeq (protein) | NP_061842 | NP_001300677; NP_081819; NP_001346378; NP_001346379 |
| Location (UCSC) | Chr X: 53.05 – 53.08 Mb | Chr X: 151.13 – 151.15 Mb |
| PubMed search |
- Wikidata
| View/Edit Human | View/Edit Mouse |

Probable G-protein coupled receptor 173 is a protein that in humans is encoded by the GPR173 gene.

== Function ==
GPR173 (Also known as Super-Conserved Receptor Expressed in Brain 3, or SREB3) is a highly conserved G protein-coupled receptor (GPCR) that plays a significant role in the regulation of the hypothalamic-pituitary-gonadal (HPG) axis, which is central to reproductive function. It is expressed in the brain and ovaries, where it is considered the putative receptor for the peptide hormone phoenixin (PNX).

Activation of GPR173 by phoenixin potentiates the secretion of luteinizing hormone (LH) in response to gonadotropin-releasing hormone (GnRH), thereby promoting ovarian cycling and supporting reproductive processes. Beyond reproduction, GPR173 has been implicated in diverse physiological functions such as food intake regulation, learning and memory, anxiety, inflammatory responses, and cardiac protection, largely through its modulation by phoenixin.

Additionally, GPR173 may act as a receptor for cholecystokinin (CCK) in certain brain regions, mediating inhibitory synaptic plasticity and potentially serving as a therapeutic target for disorders involving excitation-inhibition imbalance. The expression of GPR173 can be influenced by nutritional and environmental factors, indicating its role as a sensor and mediator in integrating external signals with neuroendocrine pathways.

== Ligands ==
GPR173 is an orphan class GPCR, however recent work has identified several compounds that may function as endogenous ligands.

=== Phoenixin ===
Recent studies have found GPR173 may act as a receptor for the peptides phoenixin-14 (PNX-14) and phoenixin-20 (PNX-20). Both Phoenixins are alternate cleavage products of SMIM20. PNX-20 treatments increased CREB phosphylation (pCREB) and ERK1/2 phosphorylation (pERK1/2) in various cell lines. These effects of PNX-20 were found to be dependent on GPR173 expression. PNX-14 treatments were found to increase intracellular cAMP treatments under specific conditions within adipocytes. As a ligand for GPR173, PNX-20 was found to have self regulatory behaviors by increasing GPR173 expression.

=== GnRH-(1-5) ===
GnRH-(1-5) is a degradation product of GnRH. GnRH-(1-5) was found to induce STAT3 phosphorylation (pSTAT3) in GN11 cells. GnRH-(1-5) was not found to affect cAMP levels or IP1 levels in GN11 cells, and did not recruit Gα_{12} or Gα_{13} to GPR173. Activation of a G subunit associated pathway could not be confirmed, however GnRH-(1-5) treatments did have GPR173 recruit β-Arrestin 2 and PTEN. GnRH-(1-5) induced production of pSTAT3 via GPR173 was found to be dependent on PTEN activity.

=== Cholecystokinin 8 (CCK8) ===
CCK8 has been found to interact with GPR173 in cell surface binding assays utilizing Flag-Tag assays. CCK1R and CCK2R are established receptors for CCk8 that signal through Gα_{q/11}. In GPR173^{+/+} CHO cells, CCK8 was found to mobilize [Ca^{2+}]_{i} with similar EC_{50} compared to CCK1R and CCK2R.

== See also ==
- SREB
- SMIM20
