= SMIM20 =

Protein-coding gene in the species Homo sapiens

Identifiers
- Aliases: SMIM20, C4orf52, small integral membrane protein 20, MITRAC7, PNX
- External IDs: OMIM: 617465; MGI: 1913528; GeneCards: SMIM20

Gene location (Human)
Chr.	Chromosome 4 (human)
Band	4p15.2	Start	25,861,830 bp
Band	4p15.2	End	25,929,813 bp

Gene location (Mouse)
Chr.	Chromosome 5 (mouse)
Band	5|5 C1	Start	53,424,425 bp
Band	5|5 C1	End	53,435,882 bp
RNA expression pattern
Bgee	Human / Mouse (ortholog); Top expressed in: mucosa of ileum; deltoid muscle; muscle of leg; gastrocnemius muscle; tibialis anterior muscle; Achilles tendon; muscle of thigh; quadriceps femoris muscle; vastus lateralis muscle; biceps brachii / Top expressed in: right kidney; muscle of thigh; soleus muscle; otolith organ; knee joint; utricle; gastrocnemius muscle; masseter muscle; quadriceps femoris muscle; proximal tubule; More reference expression data
BioGPS	n/a
Gene ontology
Molecular function	protein binding
Cellular component	membrane; integral component of membrane; mitochondrion; mitochondrial inner membrane
Biological process	mitochondrial cytochrome c oxidase assembly
Sources:Amigo / QuickGO
Orthologs
Databases	NCBI: entry; OMA: entry
Species	Human	Mouse
Entrez	389203	66278
Ensembl	ENSG00000250317	ENSMUSG00000061461
UniProt	Q8N5G0	D3Z7Q2
RefSeq (mRNA)	NM_001145432; NM_001394130	NM_001145433
RefSeq (protein)	NP_001138904	NP_001138905
Location (UCSC)	Chr 4: 25.86 – 25.93 Mb	Chr 5: 53.42 – 53.44 Mb
PubMed search
- Wikidata
View/Edit Human	View/Edit Mouse

Small integral membrane protein 20 (SMIM20) is a protein that in humans is encoded by the SMIM20 gene. SMIM20 acts as a prohormone to the peptide hormone phoenixin (PNX) which was discovered for the first time in 2013 in rodent sensory ganglia. Two alternate cleavage sites within SMIM20 results in two different phoenixin products, Phoenixin-14 (PNX-14) and Phoenixin-20 (PNX-20).

In the study of the evolution of nervous systems, SMIM20 together with NUCB2 have been found to have deep homology across all lineages that preceded creatures with central nervous systems, bilaterians, cnidarians, ctenophores, and sponges as well as in choanoflagellates.

== Receptor signaling ==
Recent studies have found that GPR173, a previously orphaned GPCR, may act as a receptor for PNX-14 and PNX-20.

== See also ==
- GPR173
