= Nucleobindin 2 =

Protein-coding gene in humans

NUCB2

Identifiers
- Aliases: NUCB2, HEL-S-109, NEFA, nucleobindin 2
- External IDs: OMIM: 608020; MGI: 1858179; GeneCards: NUCB2

Gene location (Human)
Chr.	Chromosome 11 (human)
Band	11p15.1	Start	17,208,153 bp
Band	11p15.1	End	17,349,974 bp

Gene location (Mouse)
Chr.	Chromosome 7 (mouse)
Band	7|7 F1	Start	116,103,604 bp
Band	7|7 F1	End	116,139,819 bp
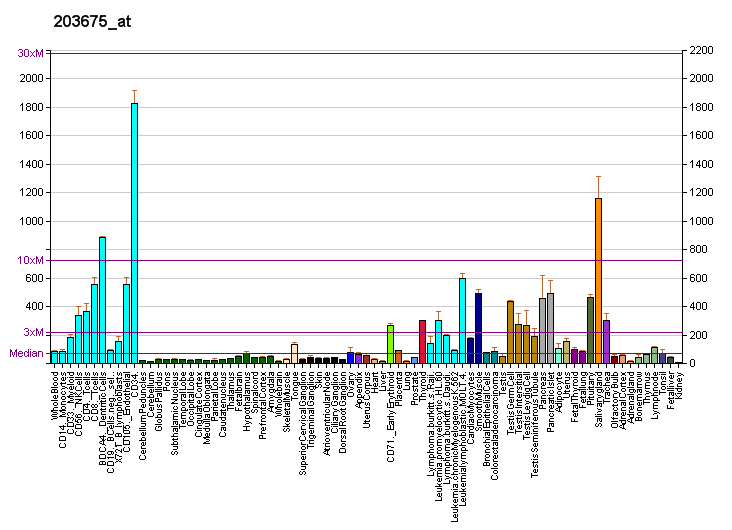
RNA expression pattern
Bgee	Human / Mouse (ortholog); Top expressed in: parotid gland; tendon of biceps brachii; bronchial epithelial cell; olfactory zone of nasal mucosa; seminal vesicula; bone marrow cell; corpus epididymis; Achilles tendon; trabecular bone; body of pancreas / Top expressed in: seminal vesicula; lacrimal gland; salivary gland; submandibular gland; lobe of prostate; parotid gland; islet of Langerhans; saccule; olfactory epithelium; supraoptic nucleus; More reference expression data
BioGPS	More reference expression data
Gene ontology
Molecular function	DNA binding; calcium ion binding; protein binding; metal ion binding
Cellular component	cytoplasm; extracellular region; cytosol; plasma membrane; Golgi apparatus; extracellular exosome; nuclear envelope; endoplasmic reticulum; membrane; nucleus; endoplasmic reticulum-Golgi intermediate compartment; extracellular space; nuclear outer membrane
Biological process	negative regulation of appetite
Sources:Amigo / QuickGO
Orthologs
Databases	NCBI: entry; OMA: entry
Species	Human	Mouse
Entrez	4925	53322
Ensembl	ENSG00000070081	ENSMUSG00000030659
UniProt	P80303	P81117
RefSeq (mRNA)	NM_005013; NM_001330227; NM_001352661; NM_001352662; NM_001352663 NM_001352664; NM_001352665; NM_001352666; NM_001352667; NM_001352668; NM_001352669; NM_001352670; NM_001352671; NM_001352672	NM_001130479; NM_016773; NM_001360375
RefSeq (protein)	NP_001317156; NP_005004; NP_001339590; NP_001339591; NP_001339592 NP_001339593; NP_001339594; NP_001339595; NP_001339596; NP_001339597; NP_001339598; NP_001339599; NP_001339600; NP_001339601	NP_001123951; NP_001347304
Location (UCSC)	Chr 11: 17.21 – 17.35 Mb	Chr 7: 116.1 – 116.14 Mb
PubMed search
- Wikidata
View/Edit Human	View/Edit Mouse

Nucleobindin-2 is a protein that in humans is encoded by the NUCB2 gene. Nucleobindin-2 is a calcium-binding EF-hand protein, and also functions as the protein precursor of nesfatin-1.

In the study of the evolution of nervous systems, NUCB2 together with SMIM20 have been found to have deep homology across all lineages that preceded creatures with central nervous systems, bilaterians, cnidarians, ctenophores, and sponges as well as in choanoflagellates.

== Interactions ==
NUCB2 has been shown to interact with NDN.
