= Super Conserved Receptor Expressed in Brain =

Protein family

G protein-coupled receptor 27

Identifiers
- Symbol: GPR27
- Alt. symbols: SREB1
- NCBI gene: 2850
- HGNC: 4482
- OMIM: 605187
- RefSeq: NM_018971
- UniProt: Q9NS67

Other data
- Locus: Chr. 3 p21-p14
Search for
- Structures: Swiss-model
- Domains: InterPro

G protein-coupled receptor 85

Identifiers
- Symbol: GPR85
- Alt. symbols: SREB2
- NCBI gene: 54329
- HGNC: 4536
- OMIM: 605188
- RefSeq: NM_018970
- UniProt: P60893

Other data
- Locus: Chr. 7 q31
Search for
- Structures: Swiss-model
- Domains: InterPro

G protein-coupled receptor 173

Identifiers
- Symbol: GPR173
- Alt. symbols: SREB3
- NCBI gene: 54328
- HGNC: 18186
- OMIM: 300253
- RefSeq: NM_018969
- UniProt: Q9NS66

Other data
- Locus: Chr. X p11
Search for
- Structures: Swiss-model
- Domains: InterPro

The Super Conserved Receptor Expressed in Brain (SREB) family are a group of related G-protein coupled receptors. Since no endogenous ligands have yet been identified for these receptors, they are classified as orphan receptors. Receptors within the group include SREB1 (GPR27), SREB2 (GPR85), and SREB3 (GPR173).
