= Shark anatomy =

The major features of sharks

Shark anatomy differs from that of bony fish in a variety of ways. Variation observed within shark anatomy is a potential result of speciation and habitat variation.

== The five chordate synapomorphies ==
Branchiostoma lanceolatum

The five chordate synapomorphies are present in chondrichthyes as follows. The five synapomorphies are pharyngeal slits, a dorsal nerve cord, notochord, endostyle, and the post-anal-tail which is depicted and labeled well on the chordates page. This image is helpful to visualize the regions where the five synapomorphies existed in chordates and what they looked like. In cephalochordates, the pharyngeal slit, or pharynx, are lateral to the throat of the chordate and work as filters by letting water pass over this region in order to retain nutrients and oxygen from gas exchange occurring. The dorsal nerve cord serves as a hollow-like backbone where signals are sent throughout the body due to nervous tissue being located in this region. The notochord is also toward the tail of the chordate but closer toward the middle of the body than the dorsal nerve cord and is a water-filled structure that allows the chordate to move in water. The endostyle is underneath the pharyngeal gill slits where proteins are trapped to eventually provide the chordate energy and sustenance. Lastly, the post-anal-tail is muscular and allows the chordate to move in water.

== Identifying the five synapomorphies in sharks ==
These evolved synapomorphies are crucial for the current shark's lifestyle; for example, the pharyngeal slit changed to become the jaw and gills. The dorsal nerve cord sends signals to the body as in ancestral species, but in sharks has developed into the central nervous system (CNS). The notochord changed from allowing movement in water to discs being formed in between vertebrae allowing for protection and acting as a buffer when movement occurs. The endostyle is the homologue of the thyroid gland and was established before the evolution of sharks; this adaptation was beneficial for the sharks' metabolism to become faster. The post-anal-tail assists with balance and movement in water.

== Skeleton ==
Sharks, as part of the class Chondrichthyes, are cartilaginous fish. The endoskeleton is made of unmineralized hyaline cartilage; it is more flexible and less dense than bone, thus conserving energy at high speeds. Each piece of skeleton is formed by an outer connective tissue called the perichondrium and then covered underneath by a layer of hexagonal, mineralized blocks called tesserae.

== Fins ==
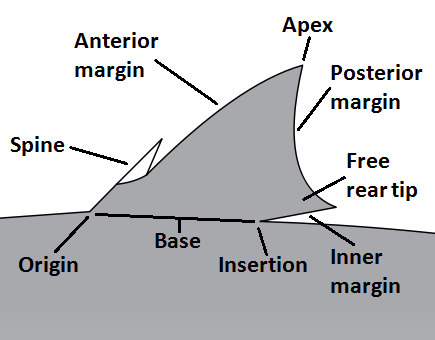
Dorsal fin diagram with landmarks labeled.

Fins allow for steering and lift in the water. Most sharks have eight fins: a pair of pectoral fins, a pair of pelvic fins, two dorsal fins, an anal fin, and a caudal fin. Pectoral fins are stiff, which enables downward movement, lift, and guidance. The members of the order Hexanchiformes have only a single dorsal fin. The anal fin is absent in the orders Squaliformes, Squatiniformes, and Pristiophoriformes. Shark fins are supported by internal rays called ceratotrichia.

=== Tail ===
The tail of a shark is the main source of thrust during movement. It consists of the caudal peduncle and the caudal fin. Most sharks have heterocercal caudal fins, meaning that the backbone extends into the (usually longer) upper lobe. The shape of the caudal fin reflects the shark's lifestyle, and can be broadly divided into five categories:

- Fast-swimming sharks of open waters, such as the mackerel sharks, have crescent-shaped tails with upper and lower lobes of almost equal size. The high aspect ratio of the tail serves to enhance swimming power and efficiency. In these species, there are usually also lateral keels on the caudal peduncle. The whale shark and basking shark also have this type of tail, although they are generally more sedate animals than the other examples.
- "Typical sharks", such as requiem sharks, have tails with the upper lobe longer than the lower. The upper lobe is turned upwards at a moderate angle relative to the body, which balances cruising efficiency with turning ability. The thresher sharks have an extreme example of this tail in which the upper lobe has evolved into a weapon for stunning prey.
- Bottom-dwelling sharks such as catsharks and carpet sharks have tails with long upper lobes and virtually no lower lobe. The upper lobe is held at a very low angle, which sacrifices speed for maneuverability. These sharks generally swim with eel-like undulations.
- Dogfish sharks also have tails with longer upper than lower lobes. However, the backbone runs through the upper lobe at a lower angle than the lobe itself, reducing the amount of downward thrust produced. Their tails cannot sustain high speeds, but combine the capability for bursts of speed with maneuverability.
- Angel sharks have unique tails among sharks. Their caudal fins are reverse heterocercal, with the lower lobe larger than the upper.

== Teeth ==
Shark teeth are strong and made of enamel. Many sharks have 3 rows of teeth. The teeth are embedded in the gums rather than the jaw. Sharks are born with teeth that are constantly being replaced. Teeth are replaced every two weeks, approximately. The shape of the teeth correspond to the diet of the shark: flat teeth for crushing shellfish, curved teeth for gripping fish, or sharp teeth with jagged edges for tearing flesh from large prey.

== Internal organs ==
In this drawing, there is a diagram of the placement of shark organs. From this model, we can see and distinguish the placement of organs compared with other species. EX. The testes of a shark are located on the ventral plane, near the fins, while a human's testes are located further down, near the bladder.

The liver is a large and oily organ that comprises 25% of the total body weight of the shark. The two purposes of this organ in the shark are to store energy and oil. The liver is a hydrostatic organ. This organ helps with buoyancy since the liver stores oils, decreasing the density of the shark's body. The shark liver is also full of an oily-like substance called shark liver oil that helps the sharks be more buoyant and acts as an energy storer, where it can be utilized when needed. The shark's liver also helps with filtrating the blood and waste while also acting as a storage region for vitamins which is incredibly important; especially if the shark goes a long time without eating or if the shark has extreme amounts of urea within the system, the liver helps with both of these scenarios. Sharks also have osmoregulation which permits the shark to have high concentrations and amounts of urea which allows them to not become dehydrated from living in seawater as opposed to freshwater. The shark kidney excretes urea that is needed for the shark to have in its system so the shark does not become dehydrated from living in seawater. Sharks hearts have two chambers. The shark heart's main importance is providing oxygenated blood to the entire body while filtering out the deoxygenated blood. A shark's spleen is also incredibly important because it is where red blood cells (RBC's) are derived and is also where the immune system functions to fight off pathogens.

== Digestive system ==
The stomach terminates at the pylorus, which leads to the duodenum and then to the spiral valve. The spiral valve is coiled to increase surface area for the absorption of nutrients. The spiral valve in turn empties into the cloaca. Sharks have shorter intestines than most animals, so food takes greater amounts of time to fully digest before being excreted from the body. This digestive gland passes secretions through the vental lobe and into the duodenum. The pancreas of the shark helps with digestion by producing the enzymes needed to break down large chunks of food, maintaining the rate of metabolism to accommodate for the large amounts of food taken in. At the very end of the short intestine lies the rectal gland which is important for the excretion waste from the animal.

== Reproductive system ==
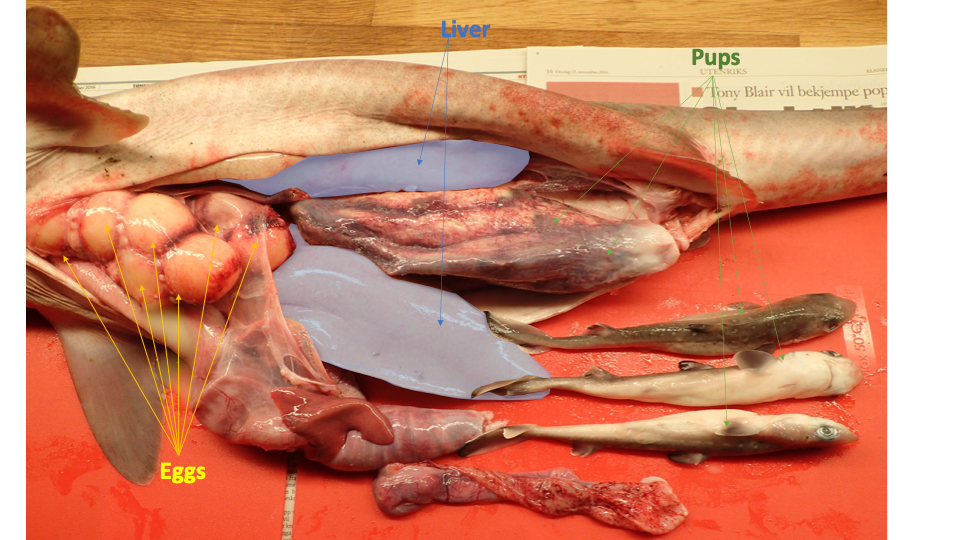
Depiction of shark anatomy including eggs, pups, and the liver

Sharks' reproductive organs serve to reproduce sexually, where the male delivers sperm to the female using claspers that insert into the female's oviduct. This then allows the female to give birth to live young, although some do lay eggs. This image depicts a dissected pregnant female Squalus acanthias specimen. The shark was carrying multiple pups; sharks can give birth to multiple live young.

== Temperature ==
Mackerel sharks such as great white sharks, shortfin mako, longfin mako, salmon shark, and porbeagle are endothermic, which helps them move quickly in cold water. These mackerel sharks warm their blood by using a heat exchange system called rete mirabile. The body temperature of mackerel sharks can be up to 10^{o} higher than the surrounding water.

== Integument ==
Unlike bony fish, the sharks have a complex dermal corset made of flexible collagenous fibers and arranged as a helical network surrounding their body. This works as an outer skeleton, providing attachment for their swimming muscles and thus saving energy. A similar arrangement of collagen fibers has been discovered in dolphins and squid. Their dermal teeth give them hydrodynamic advantages as they reduce turbulence while swimming.

=== Skin ===
Unlike the scales of bony fish, sharks have placoid scales, known as denticles. Denticles are V-shaped and are made of layers of dentine and a surface of enamel. Riblets are sockets in the shark's skin which hold the denticles. These denticles on the skin allow for the shark to move quietly, swiftly, and almost effortlessly. The skin of sharks is similar to the feeling of sandpaper, rough and abrasive. During swimming, the flexible bias of the skin that is positioned 45 degrees to the body length allows for lateral bending. This ensures that the skin stays tight to the surface, but is also flexible, preventing wrinkling and possible turbulence in streamlines passing over the body. Skin is composed of a dermis and an epidermis. In vertebrates, the epidermis produces a mucus coating to help moisten the surface of the skin and can also be used as a defense mechanism from bacterial infections. This can also help with smooth, swift, laminar flow while swimming.

=== Placoid scales ===
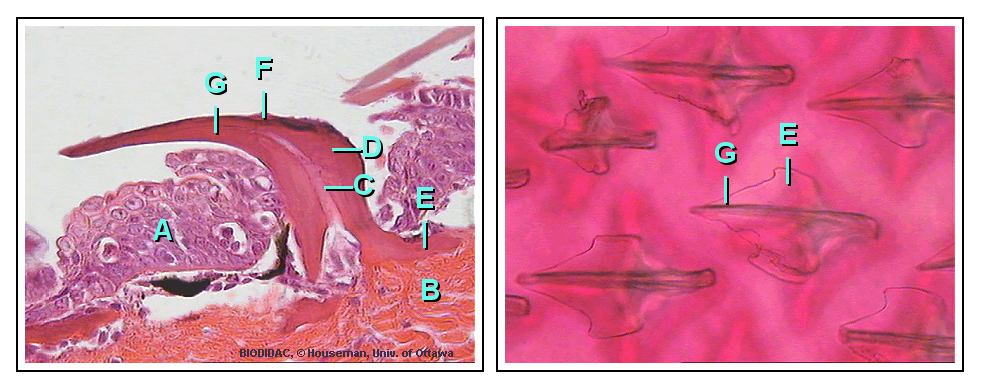
Placoid Scale

Super Smooth scales (dermal denticles) coat the skin of sharks, rays, and cartilaginous fishes due to the absence of dermal bone. These scales are present in the dermis, which has fibrous connective tissue components, and project through the epidermis, which contains secretory cells and stratified epidermal cells, to the surface. Homologous in structure to the teeth of vertebrates, these extremely strong scales serve the function of reducing turbulence and drag in water as they reduce high-velocity flow. The larger the fish, the more placoid scales they are likely to have. These projections are extremely teeth-like. The scale projection consists of enamel and a pulp cavity surrounded by dentin.

=== Ampullae of Lorenzini ===
Being most prevalent in cartilaginous fish, fish have a series of sensory organs that are arranged as a network of hundreds to thousands of pores filled with jelly near their eyes, ears, mouth, and nose. These electroreceptors are called ampullae of Lorenzini, and in 1678 they were first discovered by an Italian physician and ichthyologist, Stefano Lorenzini. These pores are used to sense and detect electromagnetic fields, and oftentimes these aid in navigational skills and hunting down prey. This can be particularly important at night because sharks cannot just depend on their vision in dark settings, they need another mechanism to help them navigate. Specifically, they are able to detect prey that is buried beneath the sand. There are two different forms of electrolocation, passive electrolocation, and active electrolocation, and sharks rely heavily on these for navigation.

== Muscles ==
Viewed as pelagic predators, sharks have a constantly elevated body temperature through their continuity in swimming, ultimately posing as a physiological advantage for sharks. A large reason they possess this advantage is due to the fact that they possess a red, aerobic, locomotor muscle (RM) and a white locomotor muscle (WM). Temperature largely affects the ability of muscles to contract, and this is with respect to both the environment and internal organismal temperature.

=== Red locomotor muscle ===
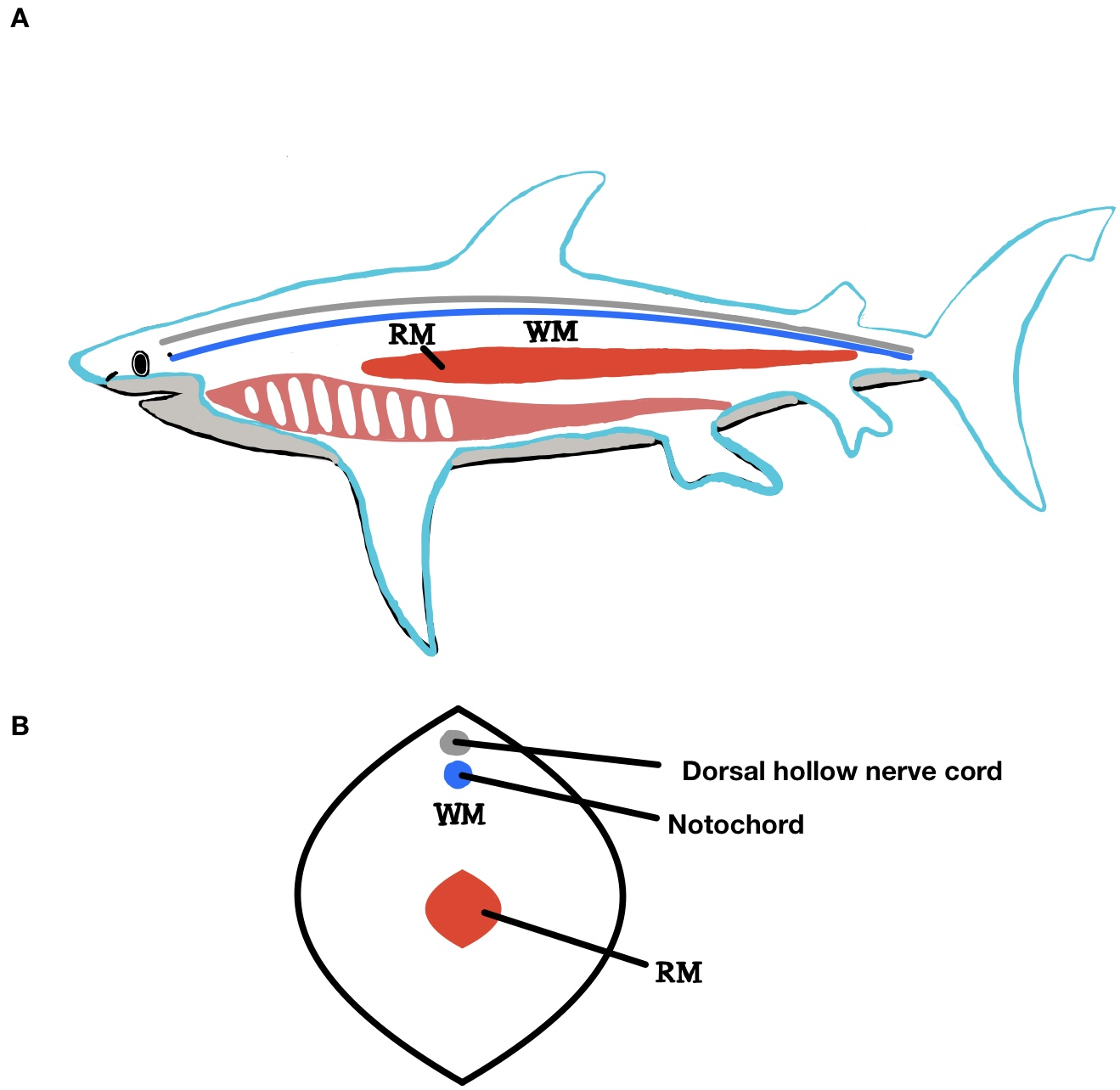
Lateral and cross section view of shark's red and white locomotor muscles

Producing approximately 25-50% of a shark's power, the RM is what powers the continuous swimming of sharks. This muscle thrives in elevated temperatures and is seen as almost mammal-like. The optimal temperature range for function is 20 to 30 degrees Celsius, and the muscles are deemed ineffective if exposed to cooler temperatures. Overall, the temperature of the RM is retained metabolically and is greatly above that of the external water temperature. This muscle also receives a sufficient blood supply which is why sharks can swim for extended periods of time, which helps break down fat. Red muscle fibers are concentrated in the ventral region of the shark and are next to the vertebral column ultimately making the spinal column stronger. In other words, the first dorsal fin is posterior to the RM. In other fishes, the RM is more lateral. This muscle is increasingly thermally sensitive in both salmon shark and tuna.

=== White locomotor muscle ===
The WM in sharks is not as thermally dependent, therefore it is more optimal in functioning across various temperatures. This helps power short bursts in a shark's swimming. This muscle is close to the RM, ultimately allowing for heat transfer from the RM to the WM. Although more suitable for cold temperatures, there has been considerable benefit from its proximal location the RM, only increasing its function. This muscle is really important in tail locomotion and is responsible for the pulsating of a sharks tail and propelling the shark forward. The muscle contracts, and then stiffens to allow the shark to coast through the water.

== Camouflage ==
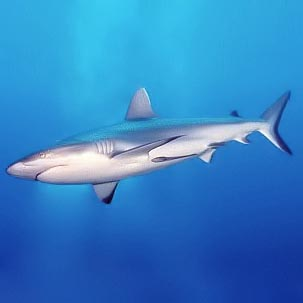
The grey reef shark has a darker dorsal surface and lighter ventral surface; this coloration is an example of countershading.

Sharks may have a combination of colors on the surface of their body that results in the camouflage technique called countershading. A darker color on the upper side and lighter color on the underside of the body helps prevent visual detection from predators. (For example, the white on the bottom of the shark blends in with the sunlight from the surface when viewed from below.) Countershading can also be accomplished through bioluminescence in the few shark species that produce and emit light, such as the kitefin shark, a species of dogfish shark. The species migrates vertically and the arrangement of light-producing organs called photophores provides ventral countershading.

Some species have more elaborate physical camouflage that assists them with blending into their surroundings. Wobbegongs and angelsharks use camouflage to perform ambush predation.

== Circulatory system ==
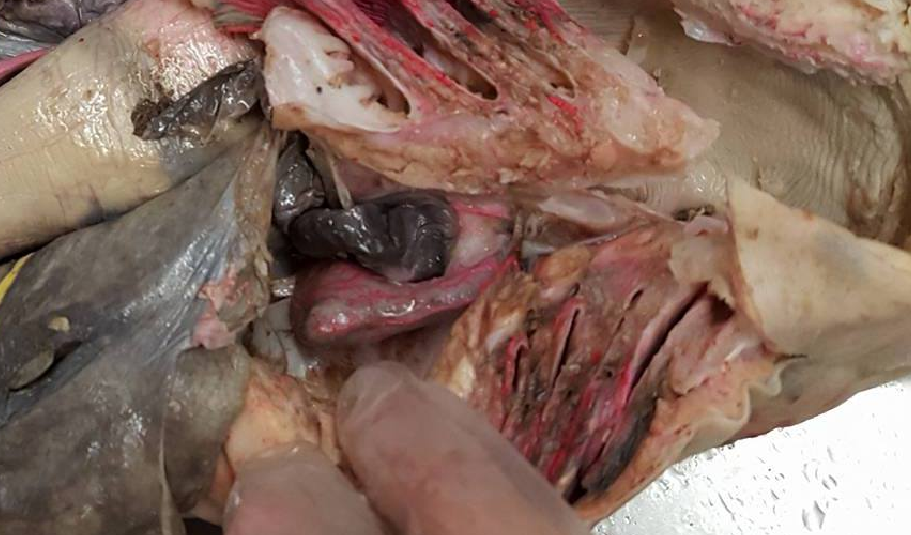
A dissected view of the unique four-chambered heart of the shark Chambers: Sinus Venosus, Atrium, Ventricle, Conus Ateriosus

Sharks possess a single-circuit circulatory system centered around a two-chambered heart. Blood flows from the heart to the gills where it is oxygenated. This oxygen-rich blood is then carried throughout the body and to the tissues before returning to the heart. As the heart beats, deoxygenated blood enters the sinus venosus. The blood then flows through the atrium to the ventricle, before emptying into the conus arteriosus and leaving the heart.

== Respiratory system ==
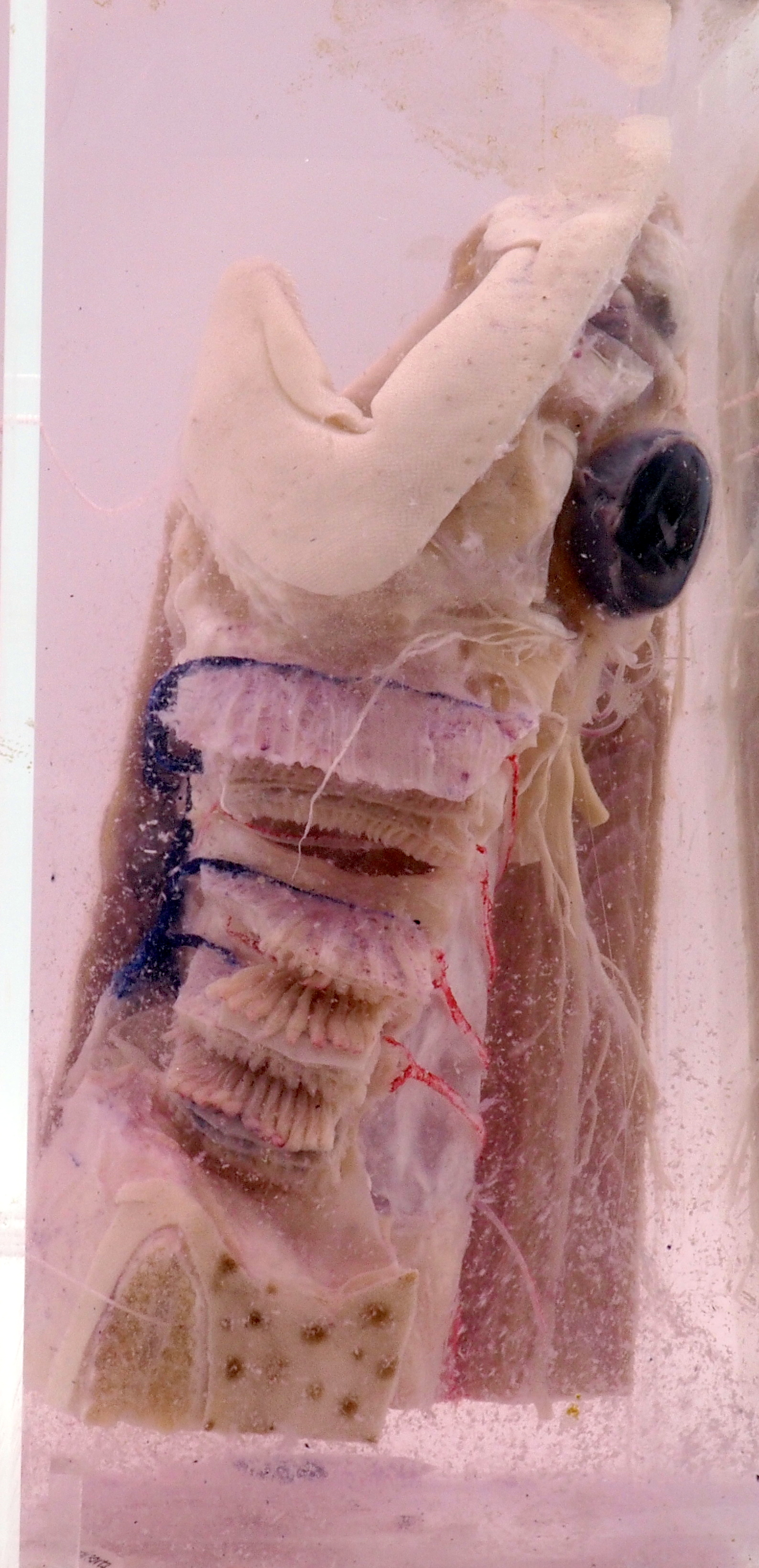
Shark Anatomy (50693674756)

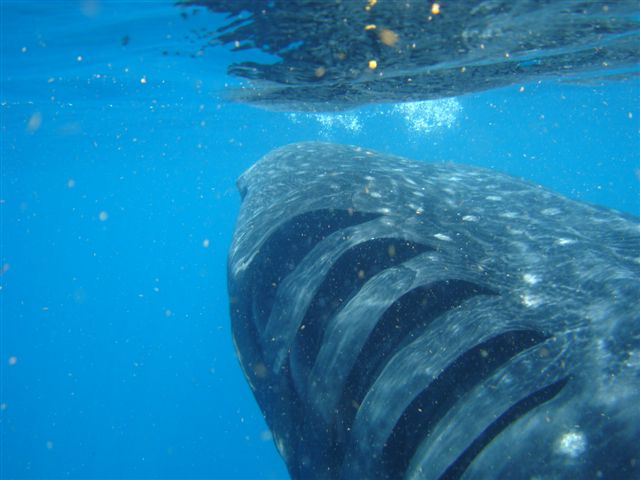
The gill slits of a whale shark flaring as it expels water from its pharyngeal cavity.

In the shark anatomy image, it depicts the beginning half of the shark, including the gills. The shark gills are especially important and were evolved from the chordate pharyngeal gill slits synapomorphy. Like lungs in other animals, gills are essential for sharks to breathe underwater by extracting oxygen from water. The water enters through the mouth, passes into the pharynx, and exits through the gill slits. Most shark species have five gill slits on each side, however, some species can have up to six or seven like the sixgill sawshark and sharks in the order Hexanchiformes. As part of their respiratory system, sharks also have an accessory respiratory opening called a spiracle behind their eyes. Spiracles are cartilaginous structures located on the top of a shark's head to draw oxygenated water from above in addition to it passing over the gills.

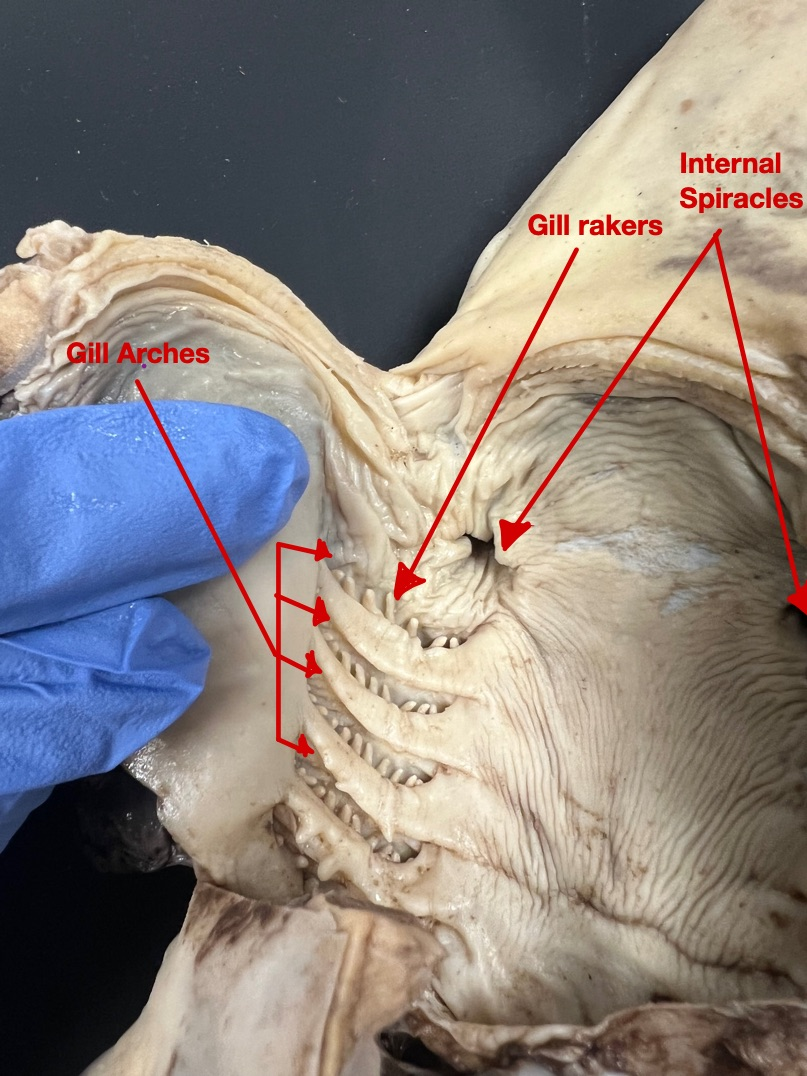
A ventral dissection of a pregnant female dogshark exposing its internal gill slits and internal spiracles.

=== Gill structure and components ===
Like most fishes, sharks gill slits are located on its external surface on both lateral sides near the head. Inside the gill slits, are long projection-like structures called gill filaments. Gill filaments are lateral to the gill arches and have a high surface area, where they form folds (lamellae) inside the gill slits. Lamellae in the gill slits are thin, membrane folds that have access to blood supplies via arteries and are the site of gas exchange. When oxygen-rich water enters the gills, the blood takes up the oxygen through diffusion at the site of lamellae and expels carbon dioxide. To support the gills in ventilation, spiracles take in more water and ventilate the gill, even when sharks are feeding. Gill rakers are cartilaginous structures inside gill arches that act in the filtration of food particles in feeding as water moves in through the gills.

=== Mechanisms of breathing ===
There are two mechanisms that sharks can use to move water over their gills: in buccal pumping, the shark actively pulls in water using its buccal muscles, while in ram ventilation, the shark swims forward, forcing water into its mouth and through its gills. Buccal pumping is more energy intensive than ram ventilation. Sedentary, bottom-dwelling sharks generally use buccal pumping to move water over to their gills compared to more active sharks, who will use ram ventilation and swim to force water to their mouth and gills. Most sharks can switch between these mechanisms as the situation requires depending on the abundance of oxygen in the water. A few species, such as the great white shark, have lost the ability to perform buccal pumping and will suffocate if they stop moving forward due to insufficient oxygen passing over their gills.

== See also ==
- Fish anatomy
