= Nesfatin-1 =

Neuropeptide produced in the hypothalamus of mammals

Nesfatin-1 is a protein that is cleaved from the precursor protein nucleobindin 2 (NUCB2). It is produced in the hypothalamus of mammals, and acts as a neuropeptide. It participates in the regulation of hunger and fat storage. Increased nesfatin-1 in the hypothalamus contributes to diminished hunger, a 'sense of fullness', and a potential loss of body fat and weight.

A study of metabolic effects of nesfatin-1 in rats was done in which subjects administered nesfatin-1 ate less, used more stored fat and became more active. Nesfatin-1-induced inhibition of feeding may be mediated through the inhibition of orexigenic neurons. In addition, the protein stimulated insulin secretion from the pancreatic beta cells of both rats and mice. Nesfatin-1 can cross the blood–brain barrier without saturation.

== See also ==
- Diabetes
- Ghrelin
- Insulin
- Leptin
- Nucleobindin-2
- Obestatin
