= Nerve net =

Nervous systems lacking a brain

3D reconstruction of sensory cells allows for the identification of simple circuits.

Close association of mesogleal neurons and the SNN.

Connectivity and ultrastructure of the ctenophore SNN.

Ctenophores and their nervous system.

A nerve net is primitive nervous system consisting of interconnected neurons lacking a brain or any form of cephalization. While organisms with bilateral body symmetry are normally associated with a condensation of neurons or, in more advanced forms, a central nervous system, organisms with radial symmetry are associated with nerve nets, and are found in members of the Ctenophora, Cnidaria, and Echinodermata phyla, all of which are found in marine environments. In the Xenacoelomorpha, a phylum of bilaterally symmetrical animals, members of the subphylum Xenoturbellida also possess a nerve net. Nerve nets can provide animals with the ability to sense objects through the use of the sensory neurons within the nerve net.

It also exists in several other phyla, like chordates, annelids and flatworms, but then always alongside longitudinal nerve(s) (nerve cord) and/or a brain.

The nerve net is the simplest form of a nervous system found in multicellular organisms. Unlike central nervous systems, where neurons are typically grouped together, neurons found in nerve nets are spread apart. This nervous system allows cnidarians to respond to physical contact. They can detect food and other chemicals in a rudimentary way. While a nerve net allows an organism to respond to its environment, it does not enable the organism to detect the source of the stimulus. For this reason, simple animals with nerve nets, such as Hydra, will typically produce the same motor output in response to contact with a stimulus, regardless of the point of contact.

The anatomy and positioning of nerve nets can vary from organism to organism. Hydra, which are cnidarians, have a nerve net throughout their body. On the other hand, sea stars, which are echinoderms, have a nerve net in each arm, connected by a central radial nerve ring at the center. This is better suited to controlling more complex movements than a diffuse nerve net.

== Evolution ==
=== Background ===
Nerve nets are found in species in the phyla Cnidaria (e.g. scyphozoa, box jellyfish, and sea anemones), Ctenophora, and Echinodermata. Cnidaria and Ctenophora both exhibit radial symmetry and are collectively known as coelenterates. Coelenterates diverged 570 million years ago, prior to the Cambrian explosion, and they are the first two phyla to possess nervous systems which differentiate during development and communicate by synaptic conduction.

Most research on the evolution of nervous tissue concerning nerve nets has been conducted using cnidarians. The nervous systems of coelenterates allow for sensation, contraction, locomotion, and hunting/feeding behaviors. Coelenterates and bilaterians share common neurophysiological mechanisms; as such, coelenterates provide a model system for tracing the origins of neurogenesis. This is due to the first appearance of neurogenesis having occurred in eumetazoa, which was a common ancestor of coelenterates and bilaterians. A second wave of neurogenesis occurred after the divergence of coelenterata in the common ancestor of bilateria. Although animals with nerve nets lack a true brain, they have the ability to display complex movements and behaviors. The presence of a nerve net allows an organism belonging to the aforementioned phyla of Cnidaria, Ctenophora, and Echinodermata to have increased fitness as a result of being able to respond to their environment.

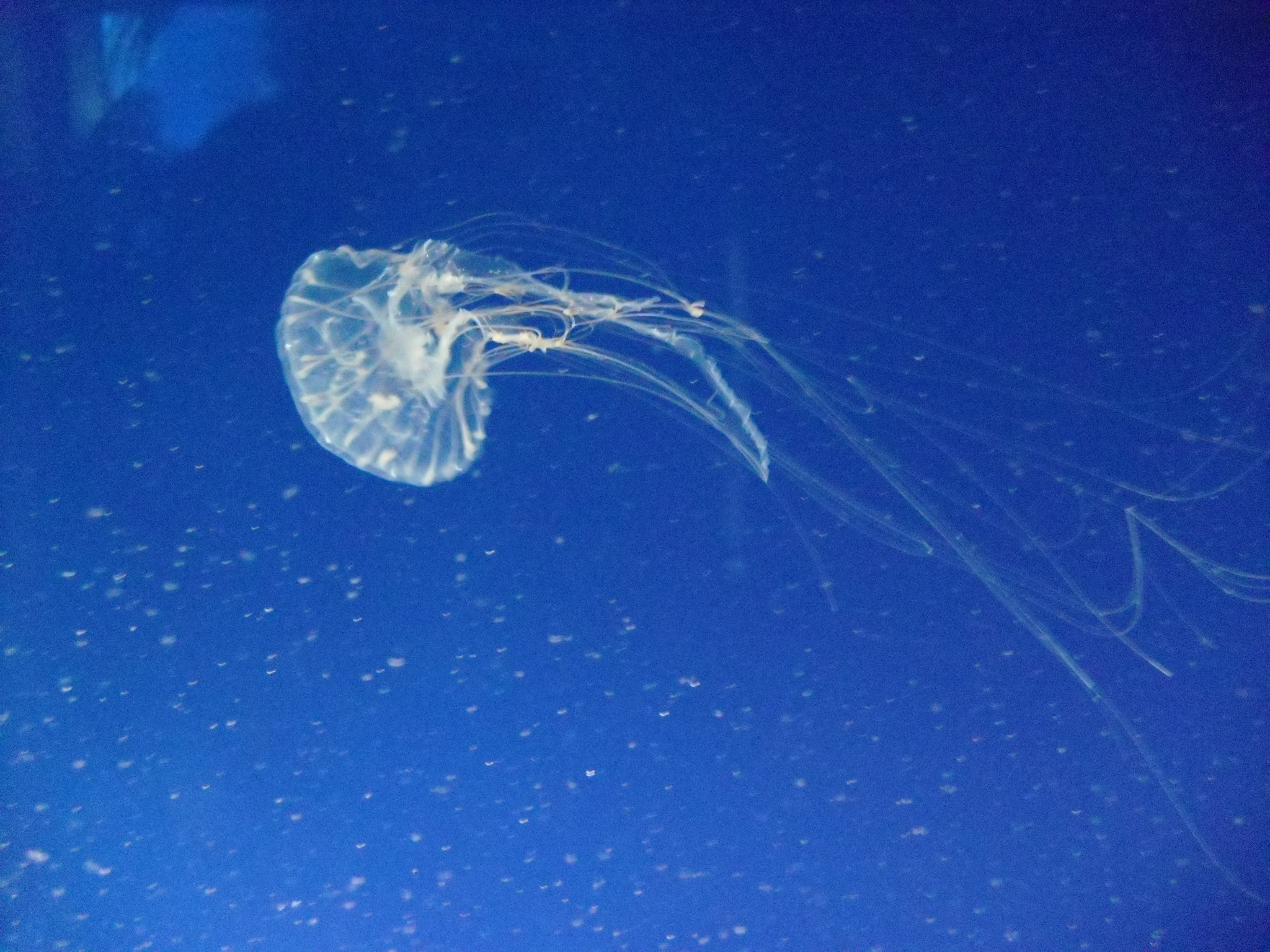
Nettle jelly

=== Emergence ===
The emergence of true nervous tissue was once thought to have followed the divergence of last common ancestor of Porifera (sponges) and Cnidaria and Ctenophora. Some molecular phylogenetic work in the 2010s and 2020s, however, suggest that Ctenophora may be sister to the other extant Metazoa. There remains a lot of controversy in this placement, with many researchers identifying alleged artifacts that led to the "Ctenophora-sister" result; according to them, correcting for this results results in a more traditional "Porifera-sister" topology, where the sponges are sister to other metazoans.

Porifera is an extant phylum within the animal kingdom, and species belonging to this phylum do not have nervous systems. Although Porifera do not form synapses and myofibrils which allow for neuromuscular transmission, they do differentiate a proto-neuronal system and contain homologs of several genes found in Cnidaria which are important in nerve formation. Sponge cells have the ability to communicate with each other via calcium signaling or by other means. Sponge larvae differentiate sensory cells which respond to stimuli including light, gravity, and water movement, all of which increase the fitness of the organism. In addition to sensory cells differentiated during development, adult Porifera display contractile activity. If the "Ctenophora-sister" scenario reflected the true history of animal evolution, either nervous systems were lost in the ancestor of Porifera, or they evolved independently in the ancestors of Ctenophora and ParaHoxozoa.

The emergence of nervous systems has been linked to the evolution of voltage-gated sodium (Nav) channels. The Nav channels allow for communication between cells over long distances through the propagation of action potentials, whereas voltage-gated (Cav) calcium channels allow for unmodulated intercellular signaling. It has been hypothesized that Nav channels differentiated from Cav channels either at the emergence of nervous systems or before the emergence of multicellular organisms, although the origin of Nav channels in history remains unknown. Porifera either came about as a result of the divergence with Cnidaria and Ctenophora or they lost the function of the gene encoding Nav channels. As a result, Porifera contain Cav channels which allows for intercellular signaling, but they lack Nav channels which provide for the conductance of action potentials in nerve nets.

=== Specialization and centralization ===
By comparison of developmental pathways of nervous systems (across nerve-net-having and nerve-cord-having phyla), it appears that all nerve-having phyla of animals have two populations of specialized integration centers: the sensory–neurosecretory apical nervous system (ANS) and the motor-integrative blastoporal nervous system (BNS). The ctenophores and cnidarians have these on opposite sides of the body, ANS on the anterior end, BNS on the posterior end.

Some groups of cnidarians – the sea anemone larva, the Hydrozoan medusa – have up to two ring-shaped concentrations of neurons and axons around the pharynx or interconnecting the rhopalia in immature stages of growth, functioning as a partly centralized BNS.

The nerve net is the evolutionary precursor to the central nervous system, which is most importantly characterized by condensation of the net into one or more longitudinal nerve cords. This condensation has happened multiple times in the Bilateria, independently to different degrees and numbers, yet using a similar set of underlying transcription factors to determine the placement of the cord(s). Orthologs of the transcription factors specifying the longitudinal cord (motor-integrative part of the CNS) are associated with the BNS. The sensory-neurosecretory part of the CNS is instead specified by genes similar to those that mark the ANS. In some bilateria, the anterior (head) part of the cord would go on to evolve into a brain.

== Developmental neurogenesis ==
Developmental neurogenesis of nerve nets is conserved between phyla and has been mainly studied in cnidaria, especially in the model organism Hydra. The following discusses the development of the nerve net in Cnidaria, but the same mechanism for the differentiation of nervous tissue is seen in Ctenophora and Echinodermata.

Cnidaria develop from two layers of tissue, the ectoderm and the endoderm, and are thus termed diploblasts. The ectoderm and the endoderm are separated by an extra-cellular matrix layer called the mesoglea. Cnidaria begin to differentiate their nervous systems in the late gastrula. In Hydrozoa and Anthozoa, interstitial stem cells from the endoderm generate neuroblasts and nematoblasts which migrate to the ectoderm and provide for the formation of the nervous system along the anterior-posterior axis. Non-hydrozoa lack interstitial stem cells, and the neurons arise from epithelial cells, which are most likely differentiated from the ectoderm as occurs in vertebrates. Differentiation occurs near the aboral pore and this is where most neurons remain.

In Cnidaria larvae, neurons are not distributed homogenously along the anterior-posterior axis; Cnidaria demonstrate anatomical polarities during the differentiation of a nervous system. There are two main hypotheses that attempt to explain neuronal cell differentiation. The zootype hypothesis says that regulatory genes define an anterior-posterior axis and the urbilateria hypothesis says that genes specify a dorsal-ventral axis. Experiments suggest that developmental neurogenesis is controlled along the anterior-posterior axis. The mechanism by which this occurs is similar to that concerning the anterior to posterior patterning of the central nervous systems in bilaterians. The conservation of the development of neuronal tissue along the anterior-posterior axis provides insight into the evolutionary divergence of coelenterates and bilaterians.

Neurogenesis occurs in Cnidaria not only during developmental stages, but also in adults. Hydra, a genus belonging to Cnidaria, is used as a model organism to study nerve nets. In the body column of Hydra, there is continuous division of epithelial cells occurring while the size of the Hydra remains constant. The movement of individual neurons is coupled to the movement of epithelial cells. Experiments have provided evidence that once neurons are differentiated, epithelial cell division drives their insertion into the nerve net. As neurogenesis occurs, a density gradient of neuronal cells appears in the body. The nerve net of each cnidarian species has a unique composition and the distribution of neurons throughout the body occurs by a density gradient along the proximal-distal axis. The density gradient goes from high to low from the proximal to the distal end of the Hydra. The highest concentration of neurons is in the basal disk and the lowest (if neurons are even present) is in the tentacles. During development of Hydra, the amount of neurons gradually increases to a certain level, and this density is maintained for the duration of the organism's life-span, even following an amputation event. After amputation, regeneration occurs and the neuron density gradient is reestablished along the Hydra.

== Anatomy ==
A nerve net is a diffuse network of cells that can congregate to form ganglia in some organisms, but does not constitute a brain. In terms of studying nerve nets, the genus Hydra (and the class Hydrozoa in general) are an ideal of Cnidaria to research and on which to run tests. Reasons why they are popular model organisms include the following: their nerve nets have a simple pattern to follow, they have a high rate of regeneration, and they are easy to manipulate in experimental procedures.

There are two categories of nerve cells that are found in the nerve nets of Hydra: ganglion and sensory. While ganglion cells are normally found near the basal ends of the epithelial cells, sensory cells generally extend in an apical direction from the muscle processes of the basal ends. While Ganglia generally provide intermediary connections between different neurological structures within a nervous system, sensory cells serve in detecting different stimuli which could include light, sound, touch or temperature.

There are many subsets of neurons within a nerve net and their placement is highly position specific. Every subset of a nerve net has a constant and regional distribution. In a Hydra, cell bodies of epidermal sensory cells are usually found around the mouth at the hypostome's apical tip, neurites are usually directed down the sides of the hypostome in a radial direction, and ganglion cells are found in the hypostome's basal region (in between tentacles and just below the head). Nerve nets contain intermediate neurons which allow for modulation of neural activity which occurs between the sensation of the stimulus and motor output.

== Physiology ==
Each sensory neuron within a nerve net responds to each stimulus, like odors or tactile stimuli. The motor neurons communicate with cells via chemical synapse to produce a certain reaction to a given stimulus, therefore a stronger stimulus produces a stronger reaction from the organism. If a particular stimulus is larger than another, then more receptors of the sensory cells (which detect stimuli) will be stimulated which will ultimately trigger a larger response. In a typical unmyelinated axon, the action potential is conducted at a rate of about 5 meters per second, compared to a myelinated human neural fiber which conducts at around 120 meters per second.

While nerve nets use hormones, the total physiology is not very well understood. Hormones normally found in vertebrates have been identified in nerve net tissues. Whether they serve the same function as those found in vertebrates is not known and little research has been performed to solve the question. Hormones such as steroids, neuropeptides, indolamines, and other iodinated organic compounds have been seen in tissues of cnidarians. These hormones play a role in multiple pathways in vertebrae neurophysiology and endocrine system including reward and complex biochemical stimulation pathways for regulation of lipid synthesis or similar sex steroids.

Since cnidarian cells are not organized into organ systems it is difficult to assume the role of the endocrine-nerve net system employed by these types of species. A nerve net is considered to be a separate structure in the cnidarians and is associated with signal molecules; it is primarily considered a neurochemical pathway. Potential signal molecules have been noted in certain nerve net anatomy. How the signal molecules work is not known. It has been shown, however, that the nematocyst (stinging) response is not related to nerve activity.

== See also ==
- Ventral nerve cord in Arthropoda
- Dorsal nerve cord in Chordata
- Bilateria
- Radiata
- Neural network
