= Ventral nerve cord =

Structure of the invertebrate central nervous system

The anatomy of an insect, with the brain (#5) in teal green and ventral nerve cord (#19) in darkblue.

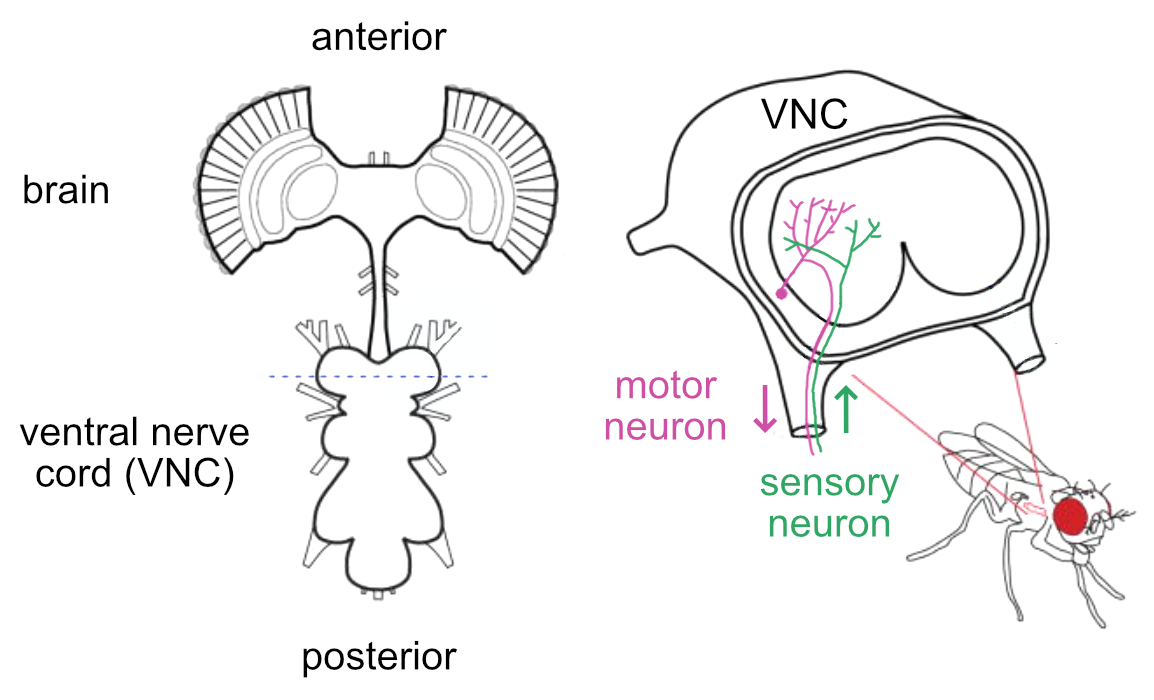
Left, a schematic of the Drosophila central nervous system, including the brain and ventral nerve cord. Right, a cross section of the ventral nerve cord, illustrating sensory input and motor output. Adapted with permission from.

The ventral nerve cord (VNC) is a major structure of the central nervous system in invertebrates that have it. As with all nerve cords, it is the functional equivalent of the vertebrate spinal cord. The ventral nerve cord coordinates neural signaling from the brain to the body and vice versa, integrating sensory input and locomotor output. Because arthropods have an open circulatory system, decapitated insects can still walk, groom, and mate—illustrating that the circuitry of the ventral nerve cord is sufficient to perform complex motor programs without brain input.

Nerve cords have evolved several times among bilateria. The chordates (which includes the vertebrates) ended up with a dorsal nerve cord (DNC). The panarthropods ended up with a singular VNC. Additional groups with VNCs include the hemichordates (1 VNC, 1 DNC), the nematodes (1 VNC, 1 DNC, 6 small NCs), the Rotifera (2 VNCs, 2 small NCs), the platyhelmithes (2 VNCs), the Nemertea (2 VNCs, 1 small DNC), the brachiopods (2 or 3 VNCs), and the annelids (1 or 2 VNCs). The Xenacoelemorpha show a more complex situation.

== Function ==
Like the vertebrate spinal cord, the function of the ventral nerve cord is to integrate and transmit nerve signals. It contains ascending and descending neurons that relay information to and from the brain, motor neurons and their central pattern generators that project into the body and synapse onto muscles, axons from sensory neurons that receive information from the body and environment, and interneurons that coordinate circuitry of all of these neurons. In addition to spiking neurons which transmit action potentials, some neural information is transmitted via non-spiking interneurons. These interneurons filter, amplify, and integrate internal and external neural signals to guide and control movement and behavior.

== Panarthropods ==
=== Structure ===
The ventral nerve cord runs down the ventral ("belly", as opposed to back) plane of the organism. It is made of nervous tissue and is connected to the brain.

Ventral nerve cord neurons are physically organized into neuromeres that process signals for each body segment. Anterior neuromeres control the anterior body segments, such as the forelegs, and more posterior neuromeres control the posterior body segments, such as the hind legs. Neuromeres are connected longitudinally, anterior to posterior, by fibrous nerve tracts called connectives. Pairs of hemisegments, corresponding to the left and right side of the ventral nerve cord, are connected horizontally by fibrous tracts called commissures.

=== Connectome ===
For the fruit fly Drosophila melanogaster, the connectome of the ventral nerve cord (and its connections to the brain) has been reconstructed down to the level of individual neurons and synapses, for both male and female flies. See Drosophila connectome.

=== Development ===
The insect ventral nerve cord develops according to a body plan based on a segmental set of 30 paired and one unpaired neuroblasts. A neuroblast can be uniquely identified based on its position in the array, its pattern of molecular expression, and the suite of early neurons that it produces. Each neuroblast gives rise to two hemilineages: an "A" hemilineage characterized by active Notch signalling, and a "B" hemilineage characterized by an absence of active Notch signalling. Research in the fruit fly D. melanogaster suggests that all neurons of a given hemilineage release the same primary neurotransmitter.

Engrailed is a transcription factor that helps regulate the gene frazzled in order to separate neuroblasts during embryonic development. The segregation of neuroblasts is essential for the formation and development of the ventral nerve cord.

=== Evolution ===
Ventral nerve cords are well-studied within insects, have been described in over 300 species covering all the major orders, and have remarkable morphological diversity. Many insects have a rope-ladder-like ventral nervous cord, composed of physically separated segmental ganglia. In contrast, in Drosophila, the thoracic and abdominal neuromeres are contiguous and the whole ventral nerve cord is considered to be one ganglion. The presumed common ancestral structure is rarely observed; instead the ventral nerve cords of most insects show extensive modification as well as convergence. Modifications include shifts in neuromere positions, their fusion to form composite ganglia, and, potentially, their separation to revert to individual ganglia. In organisms with fused neuromeres, the connectives are still there but are very reduced in length.

== Other groups ==
In the nemertodermatid small worm Meara stichopi, which belongs to the Xenacoelemorpha, there is a pair of dorsal nerve cords instead.

Because the nerve cords had evolved separately, the developmental mechanisms, their neuron cell types, and other properties also vary. Although the annelid, panarthropod, and vertebrate nerve cords are known to be tied to an orthologous set of dorsoventral patterning genes, the inclusion of other major phyla of animals show that instead of all inheriting from a shared ancestor that uses these genes as such, these groups had discovered the genetic toolkit independently.

== See also ==
- Dorsal nerve cord in chordates
- Supraesophageal ganglion, the arthropod "brain"
- Nerve net in cnidaria and echinodermata phyla
- Hemichordates, who have both dorsal and ventral nerve cords
