= GPR27 =

Protein-coding gene in the species Homo sapiens

Identifiers
- Aliases: GPR27, SREB1, G protein-coupled receptor 27
- External IDs: OMIM: 605187; MGI: 1202299; GeneCards: GPR27

Gene location (Human)
Chr.	Chromosome 3 (human)
Band	3p13	Start	71,753,855 bp
Band	3p13	End	71,756,496 bp

Gene location (Mouse)
Chr.	Chromosome 6 (mouse)
Band	6|6 D3	Start	99,669,640 bp
Band	6|6 D3	End	99,672,027 bp
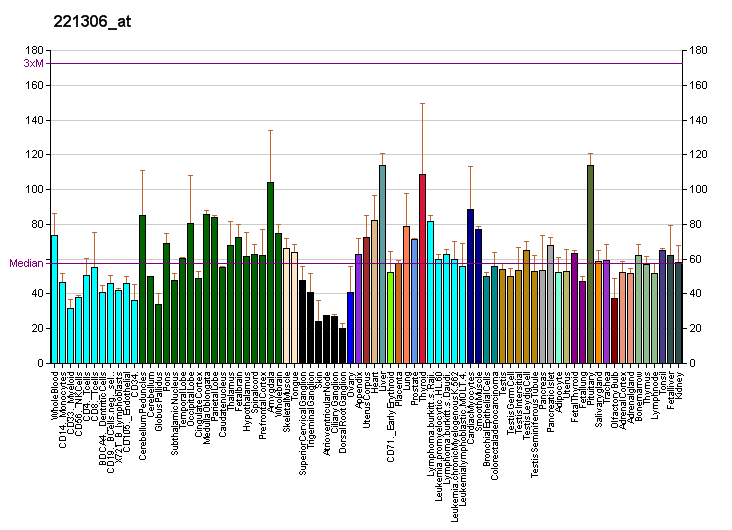
RNA expression pattern
Bgee	Human / Mouse (ortholog); Top expressed in: internal globus pallidus; endothelial cell; superior vestibular nucleus; Brodmann area 23; subthalamic nucleus; inferior ganglion of vagus nerve; nucleus accumbens; spinal cord; caudate nucleus; C1 segment / Top expressed in: olfactory tubercle; nucleus accumbens; anterior amygdaloid area; fossa; substantia nigra; ventromedial nucleus; lateral septal nucleus; vas deferens; Region I of hippocampus proper; subiculum; More reference expression data
BioGPS	More reference expression data
Gene ontology
Molecular function	signal transducer activity; G protein-coupled receptor activity
Cellular component	integral component of membrane; membrane; plasma membrane
Biological process	positive regulation of insulin secretion involved in cellular response to glucose stimulus; positive regulation of phospholipase C-activating G protein-coupled receptor signaling pathway; signal transduction; G protein-coupled receptor signaling pathway
Sources:Amigo / QuickGO
Orthologs
Databases	NCBI: entry; OMA: entry
Species	Human	Mouse
Entrez	2850	14761
Ensembl	ENSG00000170837	ENSMUSG00000072875
UniProt	Q9NS67	O54897
RefSeq (mRNA)	NM_018971	NM_008158
RefSeq (protein)	NP_061844	NP_032184
Location (UCSC)	Chr 3: 71.75 – 71.76 Mb	Chr 6: 99.67 – 99.67 Mb
PubMed search
- Wikidata
View/Edit Human	View/Edit Mouse

Probable G-protein coupled receptor 27 is a protein that in humans is encoded by the GPR27 gene.

== See also ==
- SREB
