= GPR39 =

Protein-coding gene in the species Homo sapiens

Identifiers
- Aliases: GPR39, G protein-coupled receptor 39
- External IDs: OMIM: 602886; MGI: 1918361; GeneCards: GPR39

Gene location (Human)
Chr.	Chromosome 2 (human)
Band	2q21.2	Start	132,416,805 bp
Band	2q21.2	End	132,646,582 bp

Gene location (Mouse)
Chr.	Chromosome 1 (mouse)
Band	1|1 E3	Start	125,604,732 bp
Band	1|1 E3	End	125,801,599 bp
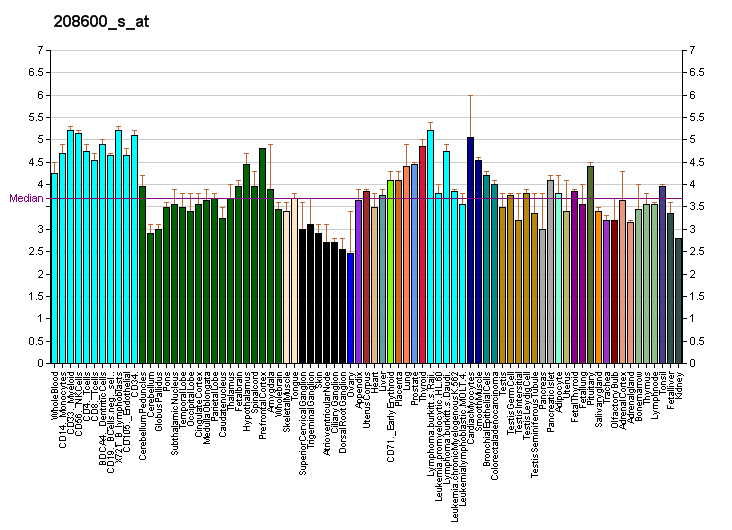
RNA expression pattern
Bgee	Human / Mouse (ortholog); Top expressed in: oocyte; secondary oocyte; gonad; sperm; ganglionic eminence; ventricular zone; right uterine tube; mucosa of transverse colon; internal globus pallidus; nucleus accumbens / Top expressed in: transitional epithelium of urinary bladder; yolk sac; spermatid; duodenum; stomach; seminal vesicula; jejunum; embryo; esophagus; epithelium of stomach; More reference expression data
BioGPS	More reference expression data
Gene ontology
Molecular function	G protein-coupled receptor activity; signal transducer activity; metal ion binding
Cellular component	integral component of membrane; plasma membrane; integral component of plasma membrane; membrane
Biological process	G protein-coupled receptor signaling pathway; signal transduction
Sources:Amigo / QuickGO
Orthologs
Databases	NCBI: entry; OMA: entry
Species	Human	Mouse
Entrez	2863	71111
Ensembl	ENSG00000183840	ENSMUSG00000026343
UniProt	O43194	Q5U431
RefSeq (mRNA)	NM_001508	NM_027677
RefSeq (protein)	NP_001499	NP_081953
Location (UCSC)	Chr 2: 132.42 – 132.65 Mb	Chr 1: 125.6 – 125.8 Mb
PubMed search
- Wikidata
View/Edit Human	View/Edit Mouse

G-protein coupled receptor 39 is a protein that in humans is encoded by the GPR39 gene.
