= GPR85 =

Protein-coding gene in the species Homo sapiens

Identifiers
- Aliases: GPR85, SREB, SREB2, G protein-coupled receptor 85
- External IDs: OMIM: 605188; MGI: 1927851; GeneCards: GPR85

Gene location (Human)
Chr.	Chromosome 7 (human)
Band	7q31.1	Start	113,078,331 bp
Band	7q31.1	End	113,087,778 bp

Gene location (Mouse)
Chr.	Chromosome 6 (mouse)
Band	6|6 A1	Start	13,834,457 bp
Band	6|6 A1	End	13,839,941 bp
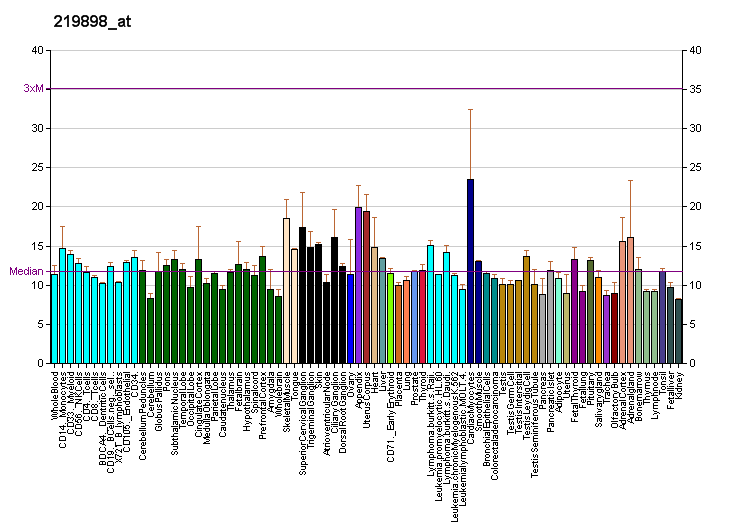
RNA expression pattern
Bgee	Human / Mouse (ortholog); Top expressed in: endothelial cell; caudate nucleus; primary visual cortex; putamen; dorsolateral prefrontal cortex; ganglionic eminence; prefrontal cortex; lateral nuclear group of thalamus; nucleus accumbens; Brodmann area 23 / Top expressed in: barrel cortex; Rostral migratory stream; Region I of hippocampus proper; piriform cortex; ventromedial nucleus; substantia nigra; temporal lobe; facial motor nucleus; lobe of cerebellum; habenula; More reference expression data
BioGPS	More reference expression data
Gene ontology
Molecular function	G protein-coupled receptor activity; protein binding; signal transducer activity
Cellular component	integral component of membrane; endoplasmic reticulum; membrane; plasma membrane
Biological process	G protein-coupled receptor signaling pathway; signal transduction
Sources:Amigo / QuickGO
Orthologs
Databases	NCBI: entry; OMA: entry
Species	Human	Mouse
Entrez	54329	64450
Ensembl	ENSG00000164604	ENSMUSG00000048216
UniProt	P60893	P60894
RefSeq (mRNA)	NM_001146265; NM_001146266; NM_001146267; NM_018970	NM_145066; NM_001330666; NM_001330667
RefSeq (protein)	NP_001139737; NP_001139738; NP_001139739; NP_061843	NP_001317595; NP_001317596; NP_659503
Location (UCSC)	Chr 7: 113.08 – 113.09 Mb	Chr 6: 13.83 – 13.84 Mb
PubMed search
- Wikidata
View/Edit Human	View/Edit Mouse

Probable G-protein coupled receptor 85 is a protein that in humans is encoded by the GPR85 gene.

== See also ==
- SREB
