= Dorsal nerve cord =

Chordate neural structure

The dorsal nerve cord is an anatomical feature found in all chordates, mainly in the subphyla Vertebrata and Cephalochordata, as well as in some hemichordates. It is one of the five embryonic features unique to all chordates, the other four being a notochord, a post-anal tail, an endostyle, and pharyngeal slits.

All chordates (vertebrates, tunicates and cephalochordates) have dorsal hollow nerve cords.

The dorsal nerve cord is located dorsal to the notochord and thus also to the gut tube (hence the name). It is formed from clustered neuronal differentiation at the axial region of the ectoderm, known as the neural plate. During embryonic development, the neural plate first invaginates longitudinally to form the neural groove, whose edges (neural folds) fuse over to form a hollow neural tube. This is an important feature as it distinguishes chordates from other invertebrate phyla such as annelids and arthropods, who have solid nerve cords that are located ventral to the gut tube and often separated into a ladder-like series of segmental ganglia. The process by which neural tube is performed from the ectoderm is called neurulation. The evolutionary explanation to this adaptation from a solid cord to a hollow tube is unknown.

In vertebrates, the dorsal nerve cord (and the subsequent neural tube) gives rise to the brain (via vesicular enlargements at the rostral end) and spinal cord, which together form a highly centralized central nervous system. All the structures developed from the dorsal nerve cord are covered by meninges and enclosed by the bony (sometimes cartilaginous) axial endoskeleton, namely the cranium (hence a synonym word for vertebrates, the craniates) and the spinal canal. The hollow cavity inside the neural tube is filled with cerebrospinal fluid (CSF), and further develops into the cerebral ventricles, aqueduct and central canal, which communicate with the also CSF-filled subarachnoid space via the median and lateral apertures.

== Terminologies ==
The word "dorsal" originates from Old French dorsalis, which in turn is from Latin dorsum, meaning "the back". This is as opposed to the term "ventral", which is etymologically from Latin ventralis or venter meaning "belly, stomach". In anatomical and embryological nomenclatures, "dorsal" refers to structures more towards the side of the embryonic epiblast, and "ventral" more towards the hypoblast side, regardless of the organism's posture and physical orientation.

Other terms such as "anterior", "posterior", "front", "back" and so on are body relative directions that are also often used, sometimes to describe a ventral-dorsal relationship among an organism's structures. Such terms are based on an frame of reference of where the subject is facing, and their meanings are dependent on the organism's current posture and orientation.

- In bipedal organisms with upright posture, "dorsal" is often synonymous with "posterior", "back" or "rear", and "ventral" with "anterior" or "front", in reference to the direct the organism is facing.
- In quadrupedal organisms that walk and stand on four limbs, the dorsal surface is often the top surface, and the ventral surface is the bottom (or lower) surface, as their torso is often orientated in a horizontal (or slightly slanted) prone position. The term "anterior" is synonymous with "rostral" (towards the nose) or "cranial" (towards the head), while "posterior" means "caudal" (towards the tail).

== See also ==
- Ventral nerve cord in some invertebrates
- Nerve net in cnidaria, echinodermata, Xenoturbella and ctenophora
- Hemichordates, who have both dorsal and ventral cords
- Anatomical terms of location
