= Segmental ganglia =

Feature of annelid and arthropod central nervous systems

The segmental ganglia (singular: s. ganglion) are ganglia of the annelid and arthropod central nervous system that lie in the segmented ventral nerve cord. The ventral nerve cord itself is a chain of metamerism ganglia, some compressed.
