= Insect physiology =

Physiology and biochemistry of insect organ systems

Insect physiology includes the physiology and biochemistry of insect organ systems.

Although diverse, insects are quite similar in overall design, internally and externally. The insect is made up of three main body regions (tagmata), the head, thorax and abdomen. The head comprises six fused segments with compound eyes, ocelli, antennae and mouthparts, which differ according to the insect's particular diet, e.g. grinding, sucking, lapping and chewing. The thorax is made up of three segments: the pro, meso and meta thorax, each supporting a pair of legs which may also differ, depending on function, e.g. jumping, digging, swimming and running. Usually the middle and the last segment of the thorax have paired wings. The abdomen generally comprises eleven segments and contains the digestive and reproductive organs. A general overview of the internal structure and physiology of the insect is presented, including digestive, circulatory, respiratory, muscular, endocrine and nervous systems, as well as sensory organs, temperature control, flight and molting.

== Digestive system ==
An insect uses its digestive system to extract nutrients and other substances from the food it consumes.

Most of this food is ingested in the form of macromolecules and other complex substances (such as proteins, polysaccharides, fats, and nucleic acids) which must be broken down by catabolic reactions into smaller molecules (i.e. amino acids, simple sugars, etc.) before being used by cells of the body for energy, growth, or reproduction. This break-down process is known as digestion.

The insect's digestive system is a closed system, with one long enclosed coiled tube called the alimentary canal which runs lengthwise through the body. The alimentary canal only allows food to enter the mouth, and then gets processed as it travels toward the anus. The alimentary canal has specific sections for grinding and food storage, enzyme production, and nutrient absorption.

Sphincters control the food and fluid movement between three regions. The three regions include the foregut (stomatodeum)(27,) the midgut (mesenteron)(13), and the hindgut (proctodeum)(16).

In addition to the alimentary canal, insects also have paired salivary glands and salivary reservoirs. These structures usually reside in the thorax (adjacent to the fore-gut). The salivary glands (30) produce saliva; the salivary ducts lead from the glands to the reservoirs and then forward through the head to an opening called the salivarium behind the hypopharynx; which movements of the mouthparts help mix saliva with food in the buccal cavity. Saliva mixes with food, which travels through salivary tubes into the mouth, beginning the process of breaking it down.

The stomatodeum and proctodeum are invaginations of the epidermis and are lined with cuticle (intima). The mesenteron is not lined with cuticle but with rapidly dividing and therefore constantly replaced, epithelial cells. The cuticle sheds with every moult along with the exoskeleton. Food is moved down the gut by muscular contractions called peristalsis.

Stylised diagram of insect digestive tract showing Malpighian tubule (Orthopteran type)

1. Stomatodeum (foregut): This region stores, grinds and transports food to the next region. Included in this are the buccal cavity, the pharynx, the oesophagus, the crop (stores food), and proventriculus or gizzard (grinds food). Salivary secretions from the labial glands dilute the ingested food. In mosquitoes (Diptera), which are blood-feeding insects, anticoagulants and blood thinners are also released here.
2. Mesenteron (midgut): Digestive enzymes in this region are produced and secreted into the lumen and here nutrients are absorbed into the insect's body. Food is enveloped by this part of the gut as it arrives from the foregut by the peritrophic membrane which is a mucopolysaccharide layer secreted from the midgut's epithelial cells. It is thought that this membrane prevents food pathogens from contacting the epithelium and attacking the insects' body. It also acts as a filter allowing small molecules through, but preventing large molecules and particles of food from reaching the midgut cells. After the large substances are broken down into smaller ones, digestion and consequent nutrient absorption takes place at the surface of the epithelium. Microscopic projections from the mid-gut wall, called microvilli, increase surface area and allow for maximum absorption of nutrients.
3. Proctodeum (hindgut): This is divided into three sections; the anterior is the ileum, the middle portion, the colon, and the wider, posterior section is the rectum. This extends from the pyloric valve which is located between the mid and the hindgut to the anus. Here absorption of water, salts and other beneficial substances take place before excretion. Like other animals, the removal of toxic metabolic waste requires water. However, for very small animals like insects, water conservation is a priority. Because of this, blind-ended ducts called Malpighian tubules come into play. These ducts emerge as evaginations at the anterior end of the hindgut and are the main organs of osmoregulation and excretion. These extract the waste products from the haemolymph, in which all the internal organs are bathed. These tubules continually produce the insect's uric acid, which is transported to the hindgut, where important salts and water are re-absorbed by both the hindgut and rectum. Excrement is then voided as insoluble and non-toxic uric acid granules. Excretion and osmoregulation in insects are not orchestrated by the Malpighian tubules alone, but require a joint function of the ileum and/or rectum.

== Circulatory system ==
The main function of insect blood, hemolymph, is that of transport and it bathes the insect's body organs. Making up usually less than 25% of an insect's body weight, it transports hormones, nutrients and wastes and has a role in osmoregulation, temperature control, immunity, storage (water, carbohydrates and fats) and skeletal function. It also plays an essential part in the moulting process. An additional role of the hemolymph in some orders can be that of predatory defence— can contain unpalatable and malodourous chemicals that will act as a deterrent to predators.

Hemolymph contains molecules, ions and cells. Regulating chemical exchanges between tissues, hemolymph is encased in the insect body cavity or haemocoel. It is transported around the body by combined heart (posterior) and aorta (anterior) pulsations which are located dorsally just under the surface of the body. It differs from vertebrate blood in that it doesn't contain any red blood cells and therefore is without high oxygen carrying capacity, and is more similar to lymph found in vertebrates.

Body fluids enter through one way valved ostia which are openings situated along the length of the combined aorta and heart organ. Pumping of the hemolymph occurs by waves of peristaltic contraction, originating at the body's posterior end, pumping forwards into the dorsal vessel, out via the aorta and then into the head where it flows out into the haemocoel. The hemolymph is circulated to the appendages unidirectionally with the aid of muscular pumps or accessory pulsatile organs which are usually found at the base of the antennae or wings and sometimes in the legs. Pumping rate accelerates due to periods of increased activity. Movement of hemolymph is particularly important for thermoregulation in orders such as Odonata, Lepidoptera, Hymenoptera and Diptera.

== Respiratory system ==
Insect respiration is accomplished without lungs using a system of internal tubes and sacs through which gases either diffuse or are actively pumped, delivering oxygen directly to tissues that need oxygen and eliminate carbon dioxide via their cells. Since oxygen is delivered directly, the circulatory system is not used to carry oxygen, and is therefore greatly reduced; it has no closed vessels (i.e., no veins or arteries), consisting of little more than a single, perforated dorsal tube which pulses peristaltically, and in doing so helps circulate the hemolymph inside the body cavity.

Air is taken in through spiracles, openings which are positioned laterally in the pleural wall, usually a pair on the anterior margin of the meso and meta thorax, and pairs on each of the eight or less abdominal segments, Numbers of spiracles vary from 1 to 10 pairs. The oxygen passes through the tracheae to the tracheoles, and enters the body by the process of diffusion. Carbon dioxide leaves the body by the same process.

The major tracheae are thickened spirally like a flexible vacuum hose to prevent them from collapsing and often swell into air sacs. Larger insects can augment the flow of air through their tracheal system, with body movement and rhythmic flattening of the tracheal air sacs. Spiracles are closed and opened by means of valves and can remain partly or completely closed for extended periods in some insects, which minimises water loss.

There are many different patterns of gas exchange demonstrated by different groups of insects. Gas exchange patterns in insects can range from continuous, diffusive ventilation, to discontinuous gas exchange.

Terrestrial and a large proportion of aquatic insects perform gaseous exchange as previously mentioned under an open system. Other smaller numbers of aquatic insects have a closed tracheal system, for example, Odonata, Trichoptera, Ephemeroptera, which have tracheal gills and no functional spiracles. Endoparasitic larvae are without spiracles and also operate under a closed system. Here the tracheae separate peripherally, covering the general body surface which results in a cutaneous form of gaseous exchange. This peripheral tracheal division may also lie within the tracheal gills where gaseous exchange may also take place.

== Muscular system ==
Many insects, such as the rhinoceros beetle, are able to lift many times their own body weight and may jump distances that are many times greater than their own length. This is because their energy output is high in relation to their body mass.

The muscular system of insects ranges from a few hundred muscles to a few thousand. Unlike vertebrates that have both smooth and striated muscles, insects have only striated muscles. Muscle cells are amassed into muscle fibers and then into the functional unit, the muscle. Muscles are attached to the body wall, with attachment fibers running through the cuticle and to the epicuticle, where they can move different parts of the body including appendages such as wings. The muscle fiber has many cells with a plasma membrane and outer sheath or sarcolemma. The sarcolemma is invaginated and can make contact with the tracheole carrying oxygen to the muscle fiber. Arranged in sheets or cylindrically, contractile myofibrils run the length of the muscle fiber. Myofibrils comprising a fine actin filament enclosed between a thick pair of myosin filaments slide past each other instigated by nerve impulses.

Muscles can be divided into four categories:

1. Visceral: these muscles surround the tubes and ducts and produce peristalsis as demonstrated in the digestive system.
2. Segmental: causing telescoping of muscle segments required for moulting, increase in body pressure, and locomotion in legless larvae.
3. Appendicular: originating from either the sternum or the tergum and inserted on the coxae these muscles move appendages as one unit. These are arranged segmentally and usually in antagonistic pairs. Appendage parts of some insects, e.g. the galea and the lacinia of the maxillae, only have flexor muscles. Extension of these structures is by haemolymph pressure and cuticle elasticity.
4. Flight: Flight muscles are the most specialised category of muscle and are capable of rapid contractions. Nerve impulses are required to initiate muscle contractions and therefore flight. These muscles are also known as neurogenic or synchronous muscles. This is because there is a one-to-one correspondence between action potentials and muscle contractions. In insects with higher wing stroke frequencies the muscles contract more frequently than at the rate that the nerve impulse reaches them and are known as asynchronous muscles.

Flight has allowed the insect to disperse, escape from enemies and environmental harm, and colonise new habitats. One of the insect's key adaptations is flight, the mechanics of which differ from those of other flying animals because their wings are not modified appendages. Fully developed and functional wings occur only in adult insects. To fly, gravity and drag (air resistance to movement) have to be overcome. Most insects fly by beating their wings and to power their flight they have either direct flight muscles attached to the wings, or an indirect system where there is no muscle-to-wing connection and instead they are attached to a highly flexible box-like thorax.

Direct flight muscles generate the upward stroke by the contraction of the muscles attached to the base of the wing inside the pivotal point. Outside the pivotal point the downward stroke is generated through contraction of muscles that extend from the sternum to the wing. Indirect flight muscles are attached to the tergum and sternum. Contraction makes the tergum and base of the wing pull down. In turn this movement lever the outer or main part of the wing in strokes upward. Contraction of the second set of muscles, which run from the back to the front of the thorax, powers the downbeat. This deforms the box and lifts the tergum.

== Endocrine system ==
Hormones are the chemical substances that are transported in the insect's body fluids (haemolymph) that carry messages away from their point of synthesis to sites where physiological processes are influenced. These hormones are produced by glandular, neuroglandular and neuronal centres. Insects have several organs that produce hormones, controlling reproduction, metamorphosis and moulting. It has been suggested that a brain hormone is responsible for caste determination in termites and diapause interruption in some insects.

Four endocrine centers have been identified:

1. Neurosecretory cells in the brain can produce one or more hormones that affect growth, reproduction, homeostasis and metamorphosis.
2. Corpora cardiaca are a pair of neuroglandular bodies that are found behind the brain and on either sides of the aorta. These not only produce their own neurohormones but they store and release other neurohormones including PTTH prothoracicotropic hormone (brain hormone), which stimulates the secretory activity of the prothoracic glands, playing an integral role in moulting.
3. Prothoracic glands are diffuse, paired glands located at the back of the head or in the thorax. These glands secrete an ecdysteroid called ecdysone, or the moulting hormone, which initiates the epidermal moulting process. Additionally it plays a role in accessory reproductive glands in the female, differentiation of ovarioles and in the process of egg production.
4. Corpora allata are small, paired glandular bodies originating from the epithelium located on either side of the foregut. They secrete the juvenile hormone, which regulate reproduction and metamorphosis.

== Nervous system ==
Insects have a complex nervous system which incorporates a variety of internal physiological information as well as external sensory information. As in the case of vertebrates, the basic component is the neuron or nerve cell. This is made up of a dendrite with two projections that receive stimuli and an axon, which transmits information to another neuron or organ, like a muscle. As with vertebrates, chemicals (neurotransmitters such as acetylcholine and dopamine) are released at synapses.

=== Central nervous system ===
An insect's sensory, motor and physiological processes are controlled by the central nervous system along with the endocrine system. Being the principal division of the nervous system, it consists of a brain, a ventral nerve cord and a subesophageal ganglion which is connected to the brain by two nerves, extending around each side of the oesophagus.

The brain has three lobes:

- Protocerebrum, innervating the compound eyes and the ocelli
- Deutocerebrum, innervating the antennae
- Tritocerebrum, innervating the foregut and the labrum.

The ventral nerve cord extends from the suboesophageal ganglion posteriorly. A layer of connective tissue called the neurolemma covers the brain, ganglia, major peripheral nerves and ventral nerve cords.

The head capsule (made up of six fused segments) has six pairs of ganglia. The first three pairs are fused into the brain, while the three following pairs are fused into the subesophageal ganglion. The thoracic segments have one ganglion on each side, which are connected into a pair, one pair per segment. This arrangement is also seen in the abdomen but only in the first eight segments. Many species of insects have reduced numbers of ganglia due to fusion or reduction. Some cockroaches have just six ganglia in the abdomen, whereas the wasp Vespa crabro has only two in the thorax and three in the abdomen. And some, like the house fly Musca domestica, have all the body ganglia fused into a single large thoracic ganglion. The ganglia of the central nervous system act as the coordinating centres with their own specific autonomy where each may coordinate impulses in specified regions of the insect's body.

=== Peripheral nervous system ===
This consists of motor neuron axons that branch out to the muscles from the ganglia of the central nervous system, parts of the sympathetic nervous system and the sensory neurons of the cuticular sense organs that receive chemical, thermal, mechanical or visual stimuli from the insect's environment. The sympathetic nervous system includes nerves and the ganglia that innervate the gut both posteriorly and anteriorly, some endocrine organs, the spiracles of the tracheal system and the reproductive organs.

=== Sensory organs ===
Chemical senses include the use of chemoreceptors, related to taste and smell, affecting mating, habitat selection, feeding and parasite-host relationships. Taste is usually located on the mouthparts of the insect but in some insects, such as bees, wasps and ants, taste organs can also be found on the antennae. Taste organs can also be found on the tarsi of moths, butterflies and flies. Olfactory sensilla enable insects to smell and are usually found in the antennae. Chemoreceptor sensitivity related to smell in some substances, is very high and some insects can detect particular odours that are at low concentrations miles from their original source.

Mechanical senses provide the insect with information that may direct orientation, general movement, flight from enemies, reproduction and feeding and are elicited from the sense organs that are sensitive to mechanical stimuli such as pressure, touch and vibration. Hairs (setae) on the cuticle are responsible for this as they are sensitive to vibration touch and sound.

Hearing structures or tympanal organs are located on different body parts such as, wings, abdomen, legs and antennae. These can respond to various frequencies ranging from 100 Hz to 240 kHz depending on insect species. Many of the joints of the insect have tactile setae that register movement. Hair beds and groups of small hair like sensilla, determine proprioreception or information about the position of a limb, and are found on the cuticle at the joints of segments and legs. Pressure on the body wall or strain gauges are detected by the campiniform sensilla and internal stretch receptors sense muscle distension and digestive system stretching.

The compound eye and the ocelli supply insect vision. The compound eye consists of individual light receptive units called ommatidia. Some ants may have only one or two, however dragonflies may have over 10,000. The more ommatidia the greater the visual acuity. These units have a clear lens system and light sensitive retina cells. By day, the image flying insects receive is made up of a mosaic of specks of differing light intensity from all the different ommatidia. At night or dusk, visual acuity is sacrificed for light sensitivity. The ocelli are unable to form focused images but are sensitive mainly, to differences in light intensity. Colour vision occurs in all orders of insects. Generally insects see better at the blue end of the spectrum than at the red end. In some orders sensitivity ranges can include ultraviolet.

A number of insects have temperature and humidity sensors and insects being small, cool more quickly than larger animals. Insects are generally considered cold-blooded or ectothermic, their body temperature rising and falling with the environment. However, flying insects raise their body temperature through the action of flight, above environmental temperatures.

The body temperature of butterflies and grasshoppers in flight may be 5 °C or 10 °C above environmental temperature, however moths and bumblebees, insulated by scales and hair, during flight, may raise flight muscle temperature 20–30 °C above the environment temperature. Most flying insects have to maintain their flight muscles above a certain temperature to gain power enough to fly. Shivering, or vibrating the wing muscles allow larger insects to actively increase the temperature of their flight muscles, enabling flight.

Until very recently, no one had ever documented the presence of nociceptors (the cells that detect and transmit sensations of pain) in insects, though recent findings of nociception in larval fruit flies challenges this and proves that all insects are very likely to feel pain.

== Reproductive system ==
Most insects have a high reproductive rate. With a short generation time, they evolve faster and can adjust to environmental changes more rapidly than other slower breeding animals. Although there are many forms of reproductive organs in insects, there remains a basic design and function for each reproductive part. These individual parts may vary in shape (gonads), position (accessory gland attachment), and number (testicular and ovarian glands), with different insect groups.

=== Female ===
The female insect's main reproductive function is to produce eggs, including the egg's protective coating, and to store the male spermatozoa until egg fertilisation is ready. The female reproductive organs include paired ovaries which empty their eggs (oocytes) via the calyces into lateral oviducts, joining to form the common oviduct. The opening (gonopore) of the common oviduct is concealed in a cavity called the genital chamber and this serves as a copulatory pouch (bursa copulatrix) when mating. The external opening to this is the vulva. Often in insects the vulva is narrow and the genital chamber becomes pouch or tube like and is called the vagina. Related to the vagina is a saclike structure, the spermatheca, where spermatozoa are stored ready for egg fertilisation. A secretory gland nourishes the contained spermatozoa in the vagina.

Egg development is mostly completed by the insect's adult stage and is controlled by hormones that control the initial stages of oogenesis and yolk deposition. Most insects are oviparous, where the young hatch after the eggs have been laid.

Insect sexual reproduction starts with sperm entry that stimulates oogenesis, meiosis occurs and the egg moves down the genital tract. Accessory glands of the female secrete an adhesive substance to attach eggs to an object and they also supply material that provides the eggs with a protective coating. Oviposition takes place via the female ovipositor.

=== Male ===
The male's main reproductive function is to produce and store spermatozoa and provide transport to the reproductive tract of the female. Sperm development is usually completed by the time the insect reaches adulthood. The male has two testes, which contain follicles in which the spermatozoa are produced. These open separately into the sperm duct or vas deferens and this stores the sperm. The vas deferentia then unite posteriorally to form a central ejaculatory duct, this opens to the outside on an aedeagus or a penis. Accessory glands secrete fluids that comprise the spermatophore. This becomes a package that surrounds and carries the spermatozoa, forming a sperm-containing capsule.

=== Sexual and asexual reproduction ===
Most insects reproduce via sexual reproduction, i.e. the egg is produced by the female, fertilised by the male and oviposited by the female. Eggs are usually deposited in a precise microhabitat on or near the required food. However, some adult females can reproduce without male input. This is known as parthenogenesis and in the most common type of parthenogenesis the offspring are essentially identical to the mother. This is most often seen in aphids and scale insects.

== Life cycle ==
An insect's life-cycle can be divided into three types:

- Ametabolous, no metamorphosis, these insects are primitively wingless where the only difference between adult and nymph is size, e.g. order: Thysanura (silverfish).
- Hemimetabolous, or incomplete metamorphosis. The terrestrial young are called nymphs and aquatic young are called naiads. Insect young are usually similar to the adult. Wings appear as buds on the nymphs or early instars. When the last moult is completed the wings expand to the full adult size, e.g. order: Odonata (dragonflies).
- Holometabolous, or complete metamorphosis. These insects have a different form in their immature and adult stages, have different behaviours and live in different habitats. The immature form is called larvae and remains similar in form but increases in size. They usually have chewing mouthparts even if the adult form mouth parts suck. At the last larval instar phase the insect forms into a pupa, it doesn't feed and is inactive, and here wing development is initiated, and the adult emerges e.g. order: Lepidoptera (butterflies and moths).

== Moulting ==
As an insect grows it needs to replace the rigid exoskeleton regularly. Moulting may occur up to three or four times or, in some insects, fifty times or more during its life. A complex process controlled by hormones, it includes the cuticle of the body wall, the cuticular lining of the tracheae, foregut, hindgut and endoskeletal structures.

The stages of molting:

1. Apolysis—moulting hormones are released into the haemolymph and the old cuticle separates from the underlying epidermal cells. The epidermis increases in size due to mitosis and then the new cuticle is produced. Enzymes secreted by the epidermal cells digest the old endocuticle, not affecting the old sclerotised exocuticle.
2. Ecdysis—this begins with the splitting of the old cuticle, usually starting in the midline of the thorax's dorsal side. The rupturing force is mostly from haemolymph pressure that has been forced into thorax by abdominal muscle contractions caused by the insect swallowing air or water. After this the insect wriggles out of the old cuticle.
3. Sclerotisation—after emergence the new cuticle is soft and this a particularly vulnerable time for the insect as its hard protective coating is missing. After an hour or two the exocuticle hardens and darkens. The wings expand by the force of haemolymph into the wing veins.
