= Diapause =

Response delay in animal dormancy

In animal dormancy, diapause is the delay in development in response to regular and recurring periods of adverse environmental conditions. It is a physiological state with very specific initiating and inhibiting conditions. The mechanism is a means of surviving predictable, unfavorable environmental conditions, such as temperature extremes, drought, or reduced food availability. Diapause is observed in all the life stages of arthropods, especially insects.

Activity levels of diapausing stages can vary considerably among species. Diapause may occur in a completely immobile stage, such as the pupae and eggs, or it may occur in very active stages that undergo extensive migrations, such as the adult monarch butterfly, Danaus plexippus. In cases where the insect remains active, feeding is reduced and reproductive development is slowed or halted.

Embryonic diapause, a somewhat similar phenomenon, occurs in over 130 species of mammals, possibly even in humans, and in the embryos of many of the oviparous species of fish in the order Cyprinodontiformes.

== Phases of insect diapause ==
Diapause in insects is a dynamic process consisting of several distinct phases. While diapause varies considerably from one taxon of insects to another, these phases can be characterized by particular sets of metabolic processes and responsiveness of the insect to certain environmental stimuli. For example, Sepsis cynipsea flies primarily use temperature to determine when to enter diapause. Similarly, Chrysoperla plorabunda lacewings regulate their reproductive cycle using daylight length, with adults entering reproductive diapause when there are less than 12-13 hours of daylight. Diapause can occur during any stage of development in arthropods, but each species exhibits diapause in specific phases of development. Reduced oxygen consumption is typical as is reduced movement and feeding. In Polistes exclamans, a social wasp, only the queen is said to be able to undergo diapause.

=== Comparison of diapause periods ===
The sensitive stage is the period when stimulus must occur to trigger diapause in the organism. Examples of sensitive stage/diapause periods in various insects:

Scientific name	Common name	Sensitive stage	Diapause
Diatraea grandiosella	Southwestern corn borer	early larval	late larval
Sarcophaga crassipalpis	Flesh fly	early larval	pupa
Sarcophaga argyrostoma	Flesh fly	mid to late larval	pupa
Manduca sexta	Tobacco hornworm	late embryonic (egg) to late larval	pupa
Leptinotarsa decemlineata	Colorado potato beetle	early adult	late adult
Bombyx mori	Silkworm	late embryonic (egg) to early larval	embryonic
Lymantria dispar	Spongy moth	late embryonic	late embryonic
Danaus plexippus	Monarch butterfly	early adulthood	adulthood
Acronicta rumicis	Knott grass moth	mid larval	mid larval
Cydia pomonella	Codling moth	early to mid larval	mid larval
Gynaephora groenlandica	Arctic woolly bear moth	mid larval	mid larval
Cuterebra fontinella	Mouse botfly	mid larval	pupa
Nothobranchius furzeri	turquoise killifish	egg	egg

=== Induction ===
The induction phase occurs at a genetically predetermined stage of life, and occurs well in advance of the environmental stress. This sensitive stage may occur within the lifetime of the diapausing individual, or in preceding generations, particularly in egg diapause. During this phase, insects are responsive to external cues called token stimuli, which trigger the switch from direct development pathways to diapause pathways. Token stimuli can consist of changes in photoperiod, thermoperiod, or allelochemicals from food plants. These stimuli are not in themselves favourable or unfavourable to development, but they herald an impending change in environmental conditions.

=== Preparation ===
The preparation phase usually follows the induction phase, though insects may go directly from induction to initiation without a preparation phase. During this phase, insects accumulate and store molecules such as lipids, proteins, and carbohydrates. These molecules are used to maintain the insect throughout diapause and to provide fuel for development following diapause termination. Composition of the cuticle may be altered by changing hydrocarbon composition and by adding lipids to reduce water loss, making the organism resistant to desiccation. Diapausing puparia of the flesh fly, Sarcophaga crassipalpis, increase the amount of cuticular hydrocarbons lining the puparium, effectively reducing the ability of water to cross the cuticle.

=== Initiation ===
Photoperiod is the most important stimulus initiating diapause. The initiation phase begins when morphological development ceases. In some cases, this change may be very distinct and can involve moulting into a specific diapause stage, or be accompanied by color change. Enzymatic changes may take place in preparation for cold hardening. For example, only diapausing adults of the fire bug, Pyrrhocoris apterus, have the enzymatic complement that allows them to accumulate polyhydric alcohols, molecules that help to lower their freezing points and thus avoid freezing. Insects may also undergo behavioural changes and begin to aggregate, migrate, or search for suitable overwintering sites.

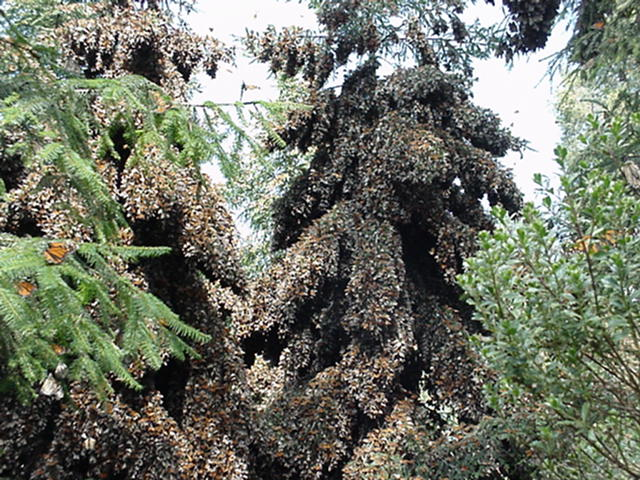
Overwintering monarch butterflies in diapause clustering on oyamel trees. One tree is completely covered in butterflies. These butterflies were located on a preserve outside of Angangueo, Michoacán, Mexico

=== Maintenance ===
During the maintenance phase, insects experience lowered metabolism and developmental arrest is maintained. Sensitivity to certain stimuli which act to prevent termination of diapause, such as photoperiod and temperature, is increased. At this stage, insects are unresponsive to changes in the environment that will eventually trigger the end of diapause, but they grow more sensitive to these stimuli as time progresses.

=== Termination ===
In insects that undergo obligate diapause, termination may occur spontaneously, without any external stimuli. In facultative diapausers, token stimuli must occur to terminate diapause. These stimuli may include chilling, freezing, or contact with water, depending on the environmental conditions being avoided. These stimuli are important in preventing the insect from terminating diapause too soon, for instance in response to warm weather in late fall. In the Edith's checkerspot butterfly, individuals must receive enough sunlight in order to terminate the diapause stage and become a fully grown butterfly. Termination may occur at the height of unfavourable conditions, such as in the middle of winter. Over time, depth of diapause slowly decreases until direct development can resume, if conditions are favourable. Termination can also occur in specific time frames linked to reproductive periods, such as in the beetle Colaphellus bowringi: diapause ends for spring-reproducing beetles between late February and early April and for autumn-reproducing beetles between mid August and early October.

=== Post-diapause quiescence ===
Diapause frequently ends prior to the end of unfavourable conditions and is followed by a state of quiescence from which the insect can arouse and begin direct development, should conditions change to become more favourable. This allows the insect to continue to withstand harsh conditions while being ready to take advantage of good conditions as soon as possible.

== Regulation ==
Diapause in insects is regulated at several levels. Environmental stimuli interact with genetic pre-programming to affect neuronal signalling, endocrine pathways, and, eventually, metabolic and enzymatic changes.

=== Environmental ===
Environmental regulators of diapause generally display a characteristic seasonal pattern. In temperate regions, photoperiod is the most reliable cues of seasonal change. This informs entry into reproductive diapause for many northern insects, including the fruit fly Drosophila montana. Depending on the season in which diapause occurs, either short or long days can act as token stimuli. Insects may also respond to changing day length as well as relative day length. Temperature may also act as a regulating factor, either by inducing diapause or, more commonly, by modifying the response of the insect to photoperiod. Insects may respond to thermoperiod, the daily fluctuations of warm and cold that correspond with night and day, as well as to absolute or cumulative temperature. This has been observed in many moth species including the Indian mealmoth, where individuals diapause in different developmental stages due to environmental temperature. Food availability and quality may also help regulate diapause. In the desert locust, Schistocerca gregaria, a plant hormone called gibberellin stimulates reproductive development. During the dry season, when their food plants are in senescence and lacking gibberellin, the locusts remain immature and their reproductive tracts do not develop.

=== Neuroendocrine ===
The neuroendocrine system of insects consists primarily of neurosecretory cells in the brain, the corpora cardiaca, corpora allata and the prothoracic glands. There are several key hormones involved in the regulation of diapause: juvenile hormone (JH), diapause hormone (DH), and prothoracicotropic hormone (PTTH).

Prothoracicotropic hormone stimulates the prothoracic glands to produce ecdysteroids that are required to promote development. Larval and pupal diapauses are often regulated by an interruption of this connection, either by preventing release of prothoracicotropic hormone from the brain or by failure of the prothoracic glands to respond to prothoracicotropic hormone.

The corpora allata is responsible for the production of juvenile hormone (JH). In the bean bug, Riptortus pedestris, clusters of neurons on the protocerebrum called the pars lateralis maintain reproductive diapause by inhibiting JH production by the corpora allata. Adult diapause is often associated with the absence of JH, while larval diapause is often associated with its presence.

In adults, absence of JH causes degeneration of flight muscles and atrophy or cessation of development of reproductive tissues, and halts mating behaviour. The presence of JH in larvae may prevent moulting to the next larval instar, though successive stationary moults may still occur. In the corn borer, Diatraea gradiosella, JH is required for the accumulation by the fat body of a storage protein that is associated with diapause.

Diapause hormone regulates embryonic diapause in the eggs of the silkworm moth, Bombyx mori. DH is released from the subesophageal ganglion of the mother and triggers trehalase production by the ovaries. This generates high levels of glycogen in the eggs, which is converted into the polyhydric alcohols glycerol and sorbitol. Sorbitol directly inhibits the development of the embryos. Glycerol and sorbitol are reconverted into glycogen at the termination of diapause.

== Tropical diapause ==
Diapause in the tropics is often initiated in response to biotic rather than abiotic components. For example, food in the form of vertebrate carcasses may be more abundant following dry seasons, or oviposition sites in the form of fallen trees may be more available following rainy seasons. Also, diapause may serve to synchronize mating seasons or reduce competition, rather than to avoid unfavourable climatic conditions.

Diapause in the tropics poses several challenges to insects that are not faced in temperate zones. Insects must reduce their metabolism without the aid of cold temperatures and may be faced with increased water loss due to high temperatures. While cold temperatures inhibit the growth of fungi and bacteria, diapausing tropical insects still have to deal with these pathogens. Also, predators and parasites may still be abundant during the diapause period.

Aggregations are common among diapausing tropical insects, especially in the orders Coleoptera, Lepidoptera, and Hemiptera. Aggregations may be used as protection against predation, since aggregating species are frequently toxic and predators quickly learn to avoid them. They can also serve to reduce water loss, as seen in the fungus beetle, Stenotarsus rotundus, which forms aggregations of up to 70,000 individuals, which may be eight beetles deep. Relative humidity is increased within the aggregations and beetles experience less water loss, probably due to decreased surface area to volume ratios reducing evaporative water loss.

== See also ==
- Eburia quadrigeminata, the species with the longest reported diapause among insects (up to 40 years).
- Polygonia c-album, whose larvae exhibit density-dependent polymorphism where one of two morphs is a diapausing phase.
- Nebria brevicollis, a carabid beetle who exhibits diapause behavior due to low food resource availability.
