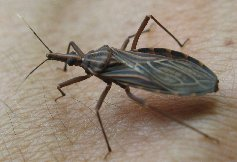

Scientific classification
- Domain: Eukaryota
- Kingdom: Animalia
- Phylum: Arthropoda
- Class: Insecta
- Order: Hemiptera
- Suborder: Heteroptera
- Family: Reduviidae
- Genus: Rhodnius
- Species: R. prolixus

Binomial name
- Rhodnius prolixus Stål, 1859

= Rhodnius prolixus =

Kissing bug, vector of Chagas disease

Rhodnius prolixus is the principal triatomine vector of the Chagas parasite due to both its sylvatic and domestic populations in northern South America as well as to its exclusively domestic populations in Central America. It has a wide range of ecotopes, mainly savanna and foothills with an altitude of between 500 and 1,500 metres (1,640 and 4,921 ft) above sea level and temperatures of 16 to 28 °C (61 to 82 °F). Sylvatic R. prolixus, as virtually all Rhodnius spp., is primarily associated with palm tree habitats and has a wide range of hosts including birds, rodents, marsupials, sloths, and reptiles.

The insect was used by Sir Vincent Wigglesworth for the detection of insect hormones. It has been implicated in the transmission of transposons between it and some of its vertebrate hosts, squirrel monkeys and opossums.

Rhodnius prolixus is also known as the kissing bug (like other triatomine bugs) because it tends to feed on the area around victims' mouths.

== History ==
Rhodnius prolixus established itself throughout Central America after specimens that originated in Venezuela accidentally escaped from a San Salvadoran research laboratory in 1915. It colonized houses and invaded neighboring countries, probably through accidental carriage by travelers.

== Life cycle ==
The insect has five larval stages, with a moult between each. Each larval stage consumes a single large meal of blood, which triggers the moulting process, 12–15 days later. Wigglesworth demonstrated that the moult is started by prothoracicotropic hormone (PTTH) secreted into the blood in response to hormone release by neurosecretory cells in the brain. Further it was demonstrated that the corpora allata secrete the juvenile hormone which prevents the premature development into an adult. The removal of the head during any larval stage causes early development into an adult, whereas the implantation of a juvenile head during the fifth larval stage results in a giant sixth stage larva.

The adult secretes compounds into the wound during feeding, including lipocalins. These lipocalins were demonstrated to serve various functions including sequestering amines – especially serotonin – to prevent vasoconstriction (and possibly coagulation) in the host by Andersen et al. 2003. The male reproductive system of R. prolixus contains four accessory glands, three which are responsible for producing the spermathecae and one which is responsible for the movement of spermatozoa from the spermatophore into the female. Once mating occurs, the sperm move through the reproductive system of the female through peristatic waves. The female then stores the sperm until fertilization.

== As disease vector ==
Chagas disease is caused by the parasitic protozoan Trypanosoma cruzi. Infection with Chagas disease occurs after Rhodnius releases protozoans in its feces immediately following a blood meal. The parasite enters the victim through the bite wound after the human host scratches the bite. Infection may also occur via blood transfusion and ingestion of food contaminated with kissing bug feces.

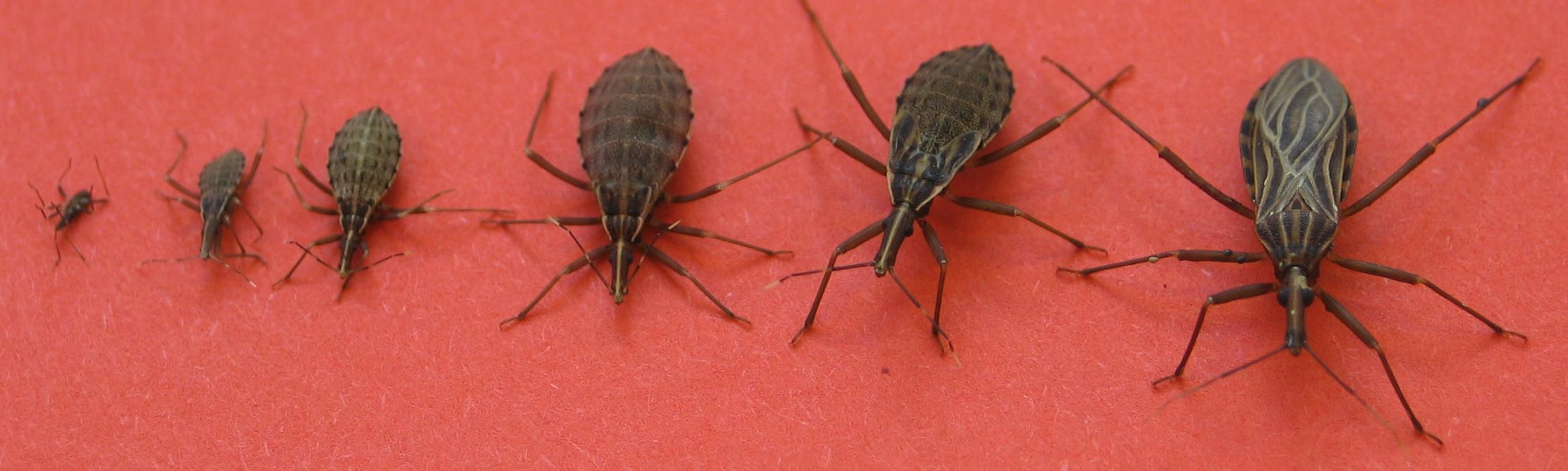
Rhodnius prolixus – range of nymph stages through to adult

== See also ==
- Inherited sterility in insects
- Hematophagy
- Hemozoin
- Nitrophorins
- Proctolin
- Vector epidemiology
