= Halloween genes =

Set of genes that influence embryonic development

20-hydroxyecdysone, a key regulatory hormone involved in cuticle development in insects

The halloween genes are a set of genes identified in Drosophila melanogaster that influence embryonic development. All of the genes code for cytochrome P_{450} enzymes in the ecdysteroidogenic pathway (the biosynthesis of ecdysone from dietary cholesterol). Ecdysteroids such as 20-hydroxyecdysone and ecdysone influence many of the morphological, physiological, biochemical changes that occur during molting in insects.

Steroid hormones control many aspects of reproduction, development, and homeostasis in higher organisms. In arthropods, steroid hormones play equal or even more vital developmental roles, especially in controlling the patterns of gene expression between developmental stages. The forerunner of steroid hormones is cholesterol that vertebrates can synthesize. In contrast, insects need to take up cholesterol in their diet. In 20E biosynthesis, a series of hydroxylation takes place and the genes that encoded the enzymes for catalyzing the hydroxylation were first identified in Drosophila. Insects have been around since about 500 million years before the first mammal and have continued to be evolutionarily successful. This suggests that exogenous cholesterol was required for the mechanism for steroid hormone biosynthesis.

First elaborated by research groups led by Wieschaus and Nüsslein-Volhard in the early 1980s, the name was coined to collectively name a series of Drosophila embryonic lethal mutations associated with defective exoskeleton formation. Early research showed that when one of the Halloween genes was mutated, fly embryos would die before the exoskeleton was created. Mutants in the halloween gene series include the spook, spookier, phantom (or phm), disembodied (or dib), shadow (or sad), and shade genes.

The mutant homozygous embryos appear phenotypically normal until mid-embryonic development where the embryos exhibit abnormal developmental characters. Some abnormal characteristics include undifferentiated cuticle, a failure of head involution, dorsal closure, compact appearance and abnormal looping of the hindgut. These embryos die before reaching the end of embryogenesis.

The mechanisms of transcriptional regulation of the Halloween genes appear to differ from one another.

== Descriptions ==
The spook gene (Cyp307a1) is expressed in the prothoracic gland, and in conjunction with the gene product of spookier (Cyp307a2), converts 7-dehydrocholesterol to Δ^{4}-diketol.

The phantom gene (Cyp306a1) encodes an encoding the microsomal 25-hydroxylase. Strong expression of phm is restricted to the prothoracic gland cells of the Drosophila larval ring gland. The gene product converts 2,22,25dE-ketodiol to 2,22dE-ketotriol.

The disembodied gene (Cyp302a1) codes for a cytochrome P_{450} enzyme that adds a hydroxyl group to the carbon-22 position of 2,22,dE-ketotriol to make 2-deoxyecdysone. dib mutants are defective in producing their cuticle and have severe defects in morphological processes such as head involution, dorsal closure and gut development.

The shadow gene (Cyp315a1) product produces ecdysone from 2-deoxyecdysone.

The shade gene (Cyp314a1) codes for an Ecdysone 20-monooxygenase responsible for adding a hydroxyl group to the 20C-position of ecdysone to make 20-hydroxyecdysone, the final step in the biosynthetic pathway.
