= Vincent Wigglesworth =

British entomologist (1899–1994)

Sir Vincent Wigglesworth
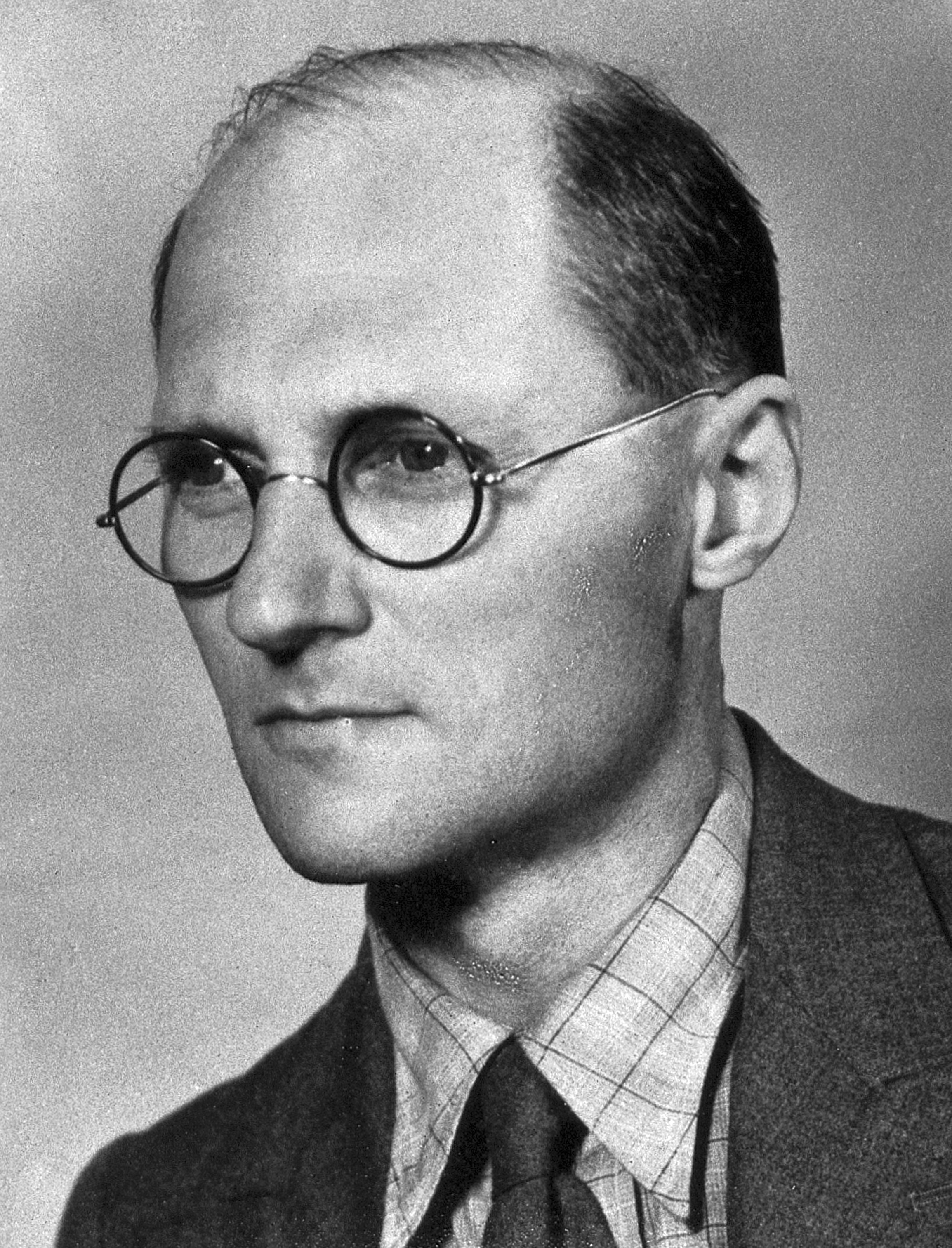
- Vincent Wigglesworth
- Born: 17 April 1899; Wesham, Lancashire
- Died: 11 February 1994 (aged 94)
- Known for: Metamorphosis hormones
- Awards: Royal Medal (1955); Fellow of the Royal Society
- Scientific career
- Fields: Entomologist
- Workplaces: University of Cambridge
- Doctoral students: Peter Lawrence

Sir Vincent Brian Wigglesworth CBE FRS (17 April 1899 – 11 February 1994) was a British entomologist who made significant contributions to the field of insect physiology. He established the field in a textbook which was updated in a number of editions.

In particular, he studied metamorphosis. His most significant contribution was the discovery that neurosecretory cells in the brain of the South American kissing bug, Rhodnius prolixus, secrete a crucial hormone that triggers the prothoracic gland to release prothoracicotropic hormone (PTTH), which regulates the process of metamorphosis. This was the first experimental confirmation of the function of neurosecretory cells. He went on to discover another hormone, called the juvenile hormone, which prevented the development of adult characteristics in R. prolixus until the insect had reached the appropriate larval stage. Wigglesworth was able to distort the developmental phases of the insect by controlling levels of this hormone. From these observations, Wigglesworth was able to develop a coherent theory of how an insect's genome can selectively activate hormones which determine its development and morphology.

== Personal life ==
Wigglesworth served in the Royal Field Artillery in France in World War I. He received his degree from the University of Cambridge and lectured at the London School of Hygiene and Tropical Medicine, the University of London, and finally at the University of Cambridge.

He was named Quick Professor of Biology at the University of Cambridge in 1952, appointed CBE in 1951, and knighted in 1964.

Wigglesworth was President of the Royal Entomological Society from 1963 to 1964 and the Association of Applied Biologists from 1966 to 1967. He was elected to the American Academy of Arts and Sciences in 1960, the United States National Academy of Sciences in 1971, and the American Philosophical Society in 1982.

He married Mable K Semple in St Albans in 1922. They had four children.

The bacterium Wigglesworthia glossinidia, which lives in the gut of the tsetse fly, is named for him.

== Works ==
=== Books ===
- Insect Physiology. London, New York. 1934. p. 152."Insect physiology". 1934.
- The Life of Insects Illustrated. Mentor Book. 1968
