= Diacylhydrazine insecticide =

Class of insecticide

Tebufenozide

Names
- Preferred IUPAC name N-tert-Butyl-N′-(4-ethylbenzoyl)-3,5-dimethylbenzohydrazide
- Other names Mimic, RH-75992, HOE-105540, Confirm 2F, Confirm 70

Identifiers
CAS Number	112410-23-8
3D model (JSmol)	Interactive image
ChEBI	CHEBI:38452
ChemSpider	82870
ECHA InfoCard	100.011.209
PubChem CID	91773
UNII	TNN5MI5EKF
CompTox Dashboard (EPA)	DTXSID7061142
- InChI: InChI=1S/C22H28N2O2/c1-7-17-8-10-18(11-9-17)20(25)23-24(22(4,5)6)21(26)19-13-15(2)12-16(3)14-19/h8-14H,7H2,1-6H3,(H,23,25) Key: QYPNKSZPJQQLRK-UHFFFAOYSA-N; InChI=1/C22H28N2O2/c1-7-17-8-10-18(11-9-17)20(25)23-24(22(4,5)6)21(26)19-13-15(2)12-16(3)14-19/h8-14H,7H2,1-6H3,(H,23,25) Key: QYPNKSZPJQQLRK-UHFFFAOYAS
- SMILES: O=C(c1cc(cc(c1)C)C)N(NC(=O)c2ccc(cc2)CC)C(C)(C)C

Properties
Chemical formula	C_{22}H_{28}N_{2}O_{2}
Molar mass	352.478 g·mol^{−1}
Melting point	191 to 191.5 °C (375.8 to 376.7 °F; 464.1 to 464.6 K)
Solubility in water	0.83 mg/L
- Except where otherwise noted, data are given for materials in their standard state (at 25 °C [77 °F], 100 kPa). Infobox references

The diacylhydrazines, also known as bisacylhydrazines (BAHs) or dibenzoylhydrazines are appropriately substituted derivatives of dibenzoyl hydrazine. They do not immediately kill the insect, but produces premature unsuccessful moulting, which then causes the death of the insect. BAHs thus belong to the class of insect growth regulators.

The insecticidal activity of RH-5849 was discovered serendipitously in 1984 at Rohm and Haas, who later commercialised tebufenozide methoxyfenozide, and halofenozide. Later other companies commercialised chromafenozide and fufenozide. The EPA removed halofenozide from the market in 2012 on the request of the manufacturer. BAHs were estimated to account for ca 1% of the 18.4-billion-dollar 2018 global pesticide market.

BAHs are used against lepidoptera, with some applications against coleopteran and dipteran pests. Many plants produce chemicals (phytoecdysteroids) which use this mode of action to kill insects.

BAHs act by agonising the ecdysone receptor. Crystal structures of BAHs bound to the ecdysone receptor were obtained.

BAHs show low mammalian and environmental toxicity. Methoxyfenozide was given a presidential green chemistry award in 1998. Both tebufenozide and methoxyfenozide were registered by the EPA under its Reduced Risk Pesticide Program.
