= Ecdysone oxidase =

Class of enzymes

ecdysone oxidase

Identifiers
- EC no.: 1.1.3.16
- CAS no.: 56803-12-4

Databases
- BRENDA: enzyme data
- ExPASy: NiceZyme view
- KEGG: enzyme entry
- MetaCyc: metabolic pathway
- Rhea: reactions
- PDB structures: RCSB PDB PDBe PDBsum
- Gene Ontology: AmiGO / QuickGO
Search
- PMC: articles
- PubMed: articles
- NCBI: proteins

In enzymology, ecdysone oxidase (EC 1.1.3.16) is an enzyme that catalyzes the chemical reaction

ecdysone
O_{2}
H_{2}O
O_{2}
H_{2}O
3-dehydroecdysone

The two substrates of this enzyme are ecdysone and oxygen. Its products are 3-dehydroecdysone and hydrogen peroxide.

This enzyme belongs to the family of oxidoreductases, acting on the CH-OH group of the donor with oxygen as acceptor. The systematic name of this enzyme class is ecdysone:oxygen 3-oxidoreductase. This enzyme might also be called beta-ecdysone oxidase.
