= Ecdysone 20-monooxygenase =

Enzyme

ecdysone 20-monooxygenase

Identifiers
- EC no.: 1.14.99.22
- CAS no.: 55071-97-1

Databases
- IntEnz: IntEnz view
- BRENDA: BRENDA entry
- ExPASy: NiceZyme view
- KEGG: KEGG entry
- MetaCyc: metabolic pathway
- PRIAM: profile
- PDB structures: RCSB PDB PDBe PDBsum
- Gene Ontology: AmiGO / QuickGO
Search
- PMC: articles
- PubMed: articles
- NCBI: proteins

Ecdysone 20-monooxygenase (EC 1.14.99.22) is an enzyme that catalyzes the chemical reaction

Ecdysone
+ reduced
acceptor
O_{2}
H_{2}O
20-Hydroxyecdysone
+ electron
acceptor

The three substrates of this enzyme are ecdysone, a reduced electron acceptor, and oxygen. Its products are the insect molting hormone, 20-hydroxyecdysone, the oxidised acceptor, and water.

This enzyme contains cytochrome P450 acting as an oxidoreductase. The systematic name of this enzyme class is ecdysone,hydrogen-donor:oxygen oxidoreductase (20-hydroxylating). The genes in the ecdysone synthesis pathway are called halloween genes: this has the nickname shade; other names in common use include alpha-ecdysone C-20 hydroxylase, and ecdysone 20-hydroxylase.
