= Tebufenozide =

Names
- Preferred IUPAC name N-tert-Butyl-N′-(4-ethylbenzoyl)-3,5-dimethylbenzohydrazide
- Other names Mimic, RH-75992, HOE-105540, Confirm 2F, Confirm 70

Identifiers
CAS Number	112410-23-8
3D model (JSmol)	Interactive image
ChEBI	CHEBI:38452
ChemSpider	82870
ECHA InfoCard	100.101.212
PubChem CID	91773
UNII	TNN5MI5EKF
CompTox Dashboard (EPA)	DTXSID4034948
- InChI: InChI=1S/C22H28N2O2/c1-7-17-8-10-18(11-9-17)20(25)23-24(22(4,5)6)21(26)19-13-15(2)12-16(3)14-19/h8-14H,7H2,1-6H3,(H,23,25) Key: QYPNKSZPJQQLRK-UHFFFAOYSA-N; InChI=1/C22H28N2O2/c1-7-17-8-10-18(11-9-17)20(25)23-24(22(4,5)6)21(26)19-13-15(2)12-16(3)14-19/h8-14H,7H2,1-6H3,(H,23,25) Key: QYPNKSZPJQQLRK-UHFFFAOYAS
- SMILES: O=C(c1cc(cc(c1)C)C)N(NC(=O)c2ccc(cc2)CC)C(C)(C)C

Properties
Chemical formula	C_{22}H_{28}N_{2}O_{2}
Molar mass	352.478 g·mol^{−1}
Melting point	191 to 191.5 °C (375.8 to 376.7 °F; 464.1 to 464.6 K)
Solubility in water	0.83 mg/L
- Except where otherwise noted, data are given for materials in their standard state (at 25 °C [77 °F], 100 kPa). Infobox references

Tebufenozide is an insecticide that acts as a molting hormone. It is an agonist of the ecdysone receptor that causes premature molting in larvae. It is primarily used against caterpillar pests. It belongs to the class of diacylhydrazines.

Because it has high selectivity for the targeted pests and low toxicity otherwise, the company that discovered tebufenozide, Rohm and Haas, was given a Presidential Green Chemistry Award for its development.

Its environmental half-life varies according to where it is released and under what conditions, but can be said to be on the order of months.

It is used as an insect growth regulator, to control leaf-eating insects that cause damage or death in trees. Tebufenozide is the active ingredient in" Bayer's MIMIC formulation, which controls forest defoliator pests such as gypsy moths, tent caterpillars, budworms, tussock moths and cabbage looper. These are all pests of the order Lepidoptera.

It has been used against the sugarcane borer, although the population grows immunity.

In California, the substance was used chiefly for crops of head lettuce, celery, raspberries, cauliflower, and tomatoes for processing.

A 1994 study conducted by the Canadian Forest Service in laboratory conditions concluded that the substance was very stable in acidic and neutral buffers at 20 °C, hydrolytic degradation was dependent on pH and temperature, sunlight photodegradation was observed at a slower rate than ultraviolet photodegradation, and that microbial metabolism and photolysis are the two main degradative routes for tebufenozide in natural aquatic systems.

The final degradation products of tebufenozide are various alcohols, carboxylic acids and ketones of low toxicity.
