= Prothoracicotropic hormone =

Prothoracicotropic hormone (PTTH) was the first insect hormone to be discovered. It was originally described simply as "brain hormone" by early workers such as Stefan Kopeć (1922) and Vincent Wigglesworth (1934), who realized that ligation of the head of immature insects could prevent molting or pupation of the body region excluded from the head if the ligation was performed before a critical age in the lifestage was reached. After a certain point the ligation had no effect and both sections of the insect would molt or pupate. However, implantation of a conspecific brain to a sessile ligated abdomen or an abdomen under diapause would induce molting or pupation. Thus, the brain was originally thought to be the source of the hormone that induces molting in insects.

Later it was established that the insect brain produces a number of hormones, but the hormone which was the cause of the observations made by Kopeć and Wigglesworth was prothoracicotropic hormone. PTTH is secreted by a neurohemal organ, the corpus cardiacum (in some insects the corpus allatum secretes PTTH) which is actually a discrete structure posterior to the brain. PTTH is released in response to environmental stimuli and as its name implies PTTH acts on the prothoracic glands, which respond by releasing molting hormone (an ecdysteroid) into the haemolymph. Molting hormone stimulates the molting process.

PTTH was first purified and identified from the silkworm Bombyx mori by Hiroshi Kataoka and colleagues with his menters Hironori Ishizaki and Akinori Suzuki in 1990. PTTH adopts the fold unique to the structural superfamily of the growth factors, such as NGF, TGF-β and PDGF. The receptor of PTTH on the prothoracic glands is a tyrosine kinase Torso.
