= Ecdysone receptor =

Nuclear receptor complex from arthropods

Ecdysone receptor protein
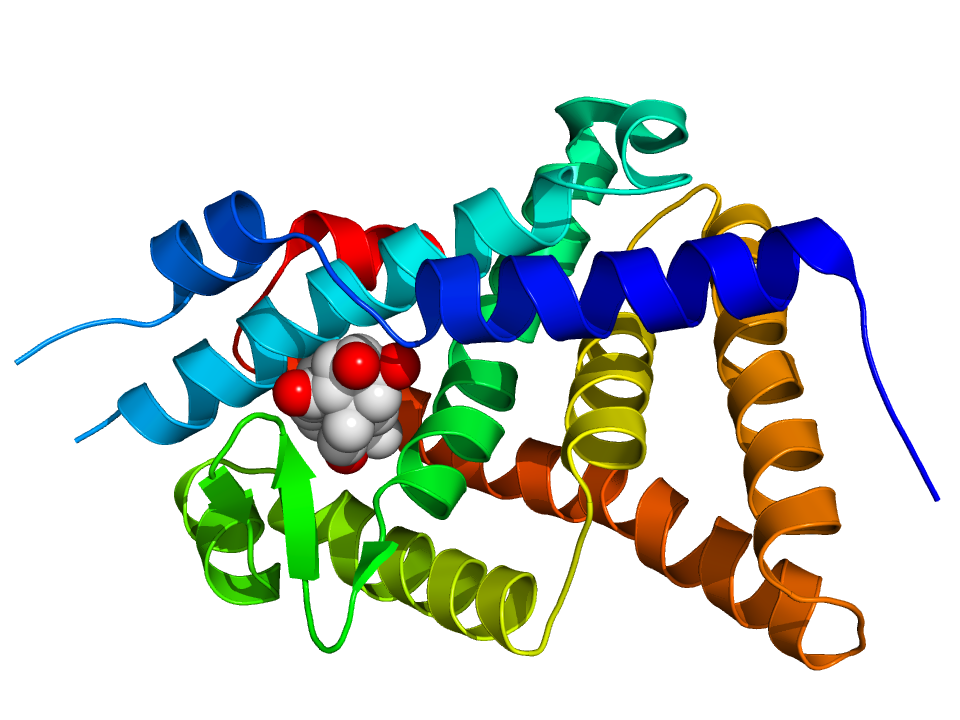
- Crystallographic structure of the ligand binding domain of the ecdysone receptor (rainbow color, N-terminus = blue, C-terminus = red) from Heliothis virescens complexed with ponasterone A (space-filling model, carbon = white, oxygen = red).

Identifiers
- Organism: Drosophila melanogaster
- Symbol: EcR
- Alt. symbols: EcRH, NR1H1
- Entrez: 35540
- Orthologs: NCBI: entry; OMA: entry
- PDB: 1R0OMore structures
- RefSeq (mRNA): NM_165461
- RefSeq (Prot): NP_724456
- UniProt: P34021

Other data
- Chromosome: 2R: 1.97 - 2.07 Mb
Search for
- Structures: Swiss-model
- Domains: InterPro

Ultraspiracle protein

Identifiers
- Organism: Drosophila melanogaster
- Symbol: USP
- Alt. symbols: Cf1, NR2B4
- Entrez: 31165
- Orthologs: NCBI: entry; OMA: entry
- PDB: 1HG4More structures
- RefSeq (mRNA): NM_057433
- RefSeq (Prot): NP_476781
- UniProt: P20153

Other data
- Chromosome: X: 1.93 - 1.94 Mb
Search for
- Structures: Swiss-model
- Domains: InterPro

The ecdysone receptor is a nuclear receptor found in arthropods, where it controls development and contributes to other processes such as reproduction. The receptor is a non-covalent heterodimer of two proteins, the ecdysone receptor (EcR) protein and ultraspiracle protein (USP). It binds to and is activated by ecdysteroids. Insect ecdysone receptors are currently better characterized than those from other arthropods, and mimics of ecdysteroids are used commercially as caterpillar-selective insecticides.

EcR and USP are the insect orthologs of the mammalian farnesoid X receptor (FXR) and retinoid X receptor (RXR) proteins, respectively. Based on sequence homology considerations, some researchers reserve the term USP for the EcR partner from lepidopteran and dipteran insects, and use RXR in all other instances.

== Function ==
Pulses of 20-hydroxyecdysone occur during insect development, whereupon this hormone binds to the ecdysone receptor, a ligand-activated transcription factor found in the nuclei of insect cells. This in turn leads to the activation of many other genes, as evidenced by puffing of polytene chromosomes at over a hundred sites. Ultimately the activation cascade causes physiological changes that result in ecdysis (moulting). The temporal expression of ecdysone receptor within neural stem cells mediates temporal patterning and neural diversity.

== Structure ==
EcR and USP share the multi-domain architecture common to all nuclear hormone receptors, namely an N-terminal transcriptional activation domain (A/B domain), a DNA-binding domain (C domain, highly conserved between receptors), a linker region (D region), a ligand-binding domain (E domain, moderately conserved), and in some cases a distinct C-terminal extension (F-domain). The DNA-binding domains of EcR and USP recognise specific short sequences in DNA, and mediate the binding of the heterodimer to these ecdysone response elements (ECREs) in the promoters of ecdysone-responsive genes.

The ecdysteroid-binding pocket is located in the ligand binding domain of the EcR subunit, but EcR must be dimerised with a USP (or with an RXR) for high-affinity ligand binding to occur. In such circumstances, the binding of an agonist ligand triggers a conformational change in the C-terminal part of the EcR ligand-binding domain that leads to transcriptional activation of genes under ECRE control. There is also a ligand-binding pocket in the corresponding domain of USP. Its natural ligand remains uncertain, and USPs appear to be locked permanently in an inactive conformation.

X-ray crystal structures have been determined for several heterodimeric DNA-binding domains and ligand-binding domains from ecdysone receptors.

== Commercial applications ==
Ecdysone receptors have two main fields of application:

- Gene switches - ecdysone receptor-controlled transgenes for controlled gene expression in scientific research, agriculture, and medicine.
- Insecticides - Diacylhydrazines, although not ecdysteroids, are agonists of lepidopteran ecdysone receptors and are used as caterpillar-selective larvicides. They are insect growth regulators and are in general environmentally benign.
