= Nitrophorin =

Proteins in salvia of bloodfeeding insects

Nitrophorins are hemoproteins found in the saliva of blood-feeding insects.

== Purpose and description ==
Saliva of the blood-sucking bug Rhodnius prolixus contains at least seven homologous nitrophorins, designated NP1 to NP7 in order of their relative abundance in the glands. As isolated, nitrophorins contain nitric oxide (NO) ligated to the ferric heme iron (Fe^{3+}). Histamine, which is released by the host in response to tissue damage, is another nitrophorin ligand. Nitrophorins transport NO to the feeding site. Dilution, binding of histamine and increase in pH (from pH ≈ 5 in the salivary gland to pH ≈ 7.4 in the host tissue) facilitate the release of NO into the tissue where it induces vasodilatation.

The salivary nitrophorin from the hemipteran Cimex lectularius (bedbug) has no sequence similarity to Rhodnius prolixus nitrophorins but is homologous to the inositol-polyphosphate 5-phosphatase (EC 3.1.3.56). It is suggested that the two classes of insect nitrophorins have arisen as a product of the convergent evolution.

== Structures ==
The crystal structures of several nitrophorin complexes are known. The Rhodnius prolixus nitrophorin structures reveal lipocalin-like eight-stranded β-barrel, three α-helices and two disulfide bonds, with heme inserted into one end of the barrel. Members of the lipocalin family are known to bind a variety of small hydrophobic ligands, including biliverdin, in a similar fashion. The heme iron is ligated to histidine residue (His-59). The position of His-59 is restrained through water-mediated hydrogen bond to the carboxylate of aspartic acid residue (Asp-70). The His-59–Fe bond is bent ~15° out of the imidazole plane. Asp-70 forms an unusual hydrogen bond with one of the heme propionates, suggesting the residue has an altered pK_{a}. In NP1-histamine structure, the planes of His-59 and histamine imidazole rings lie in an arrangement almost identical to that found in oxidized cytochrome b_{5}.

The fold of nitrophorin from Cimex lectularius consists of central 11-stranded β-sandwich and seven peripheral α-helices. The heme is positioned between β-sheet and an α-helix, with heme iron ligated to cysteinate residue. NO can bind both to heme Fe^{3+} and to proximal Cys-60 ligand causing reversible S-nitrosylation.

== External links and further reading ==
- Montfort, W.R., Weichsel, A. and Andersen, J.F. (2000). "Nitrophorins and related antihemostatic lipocalins from Rhodnius prolixus and other blood-sucking arthropods". Biochimica et Biophysica Acta (BBA) - Protein Structure and Molecular Enzymology. 1482 (1–2): 110–118. doi:10.1016/S0167-4838(00)00165-5. PMID 11058753.
- Valenzuela, J.G. & Ribeiro, J.M.C. (1998). "Purification and cloning of the salivary nitrophorin from the hemipteran Cimex lectularius". Journal of Experimental Biology. 201 (Pt 18): 2659–2664. doi:10.1242/jeb.201.18.2659. PMID 9716517.
- Weichsel, A., Maes, E.M., Andersen, J.F., Valenzuela, J.G., Shokhireva, T.Kh., Walker, F.A. and Montfort, W.R. (2005). "Heme-assisted S-nitrosation of a proximal thiolate in a nitric oxide transport protein". Proceedings of the National Academy of Sciences. 102 (3): 594–599. Bibcode:2005PNAS..102..594W. doi:10.1073/pnas.0406549102. PMC 545542. PMID 15637157.
- PDB: 1NP1 — X-ray structure of Rhodnius prolixus nitrophorin 1 complexed with histamine and PO^{3−}_{4}
- PDB: 1Y21 — X-ray structure of Cimex lectularius nitrophorin in complex with NO
- Montfort Lab - Nitrophorin research @ University of Arizona, Tucson, USA
