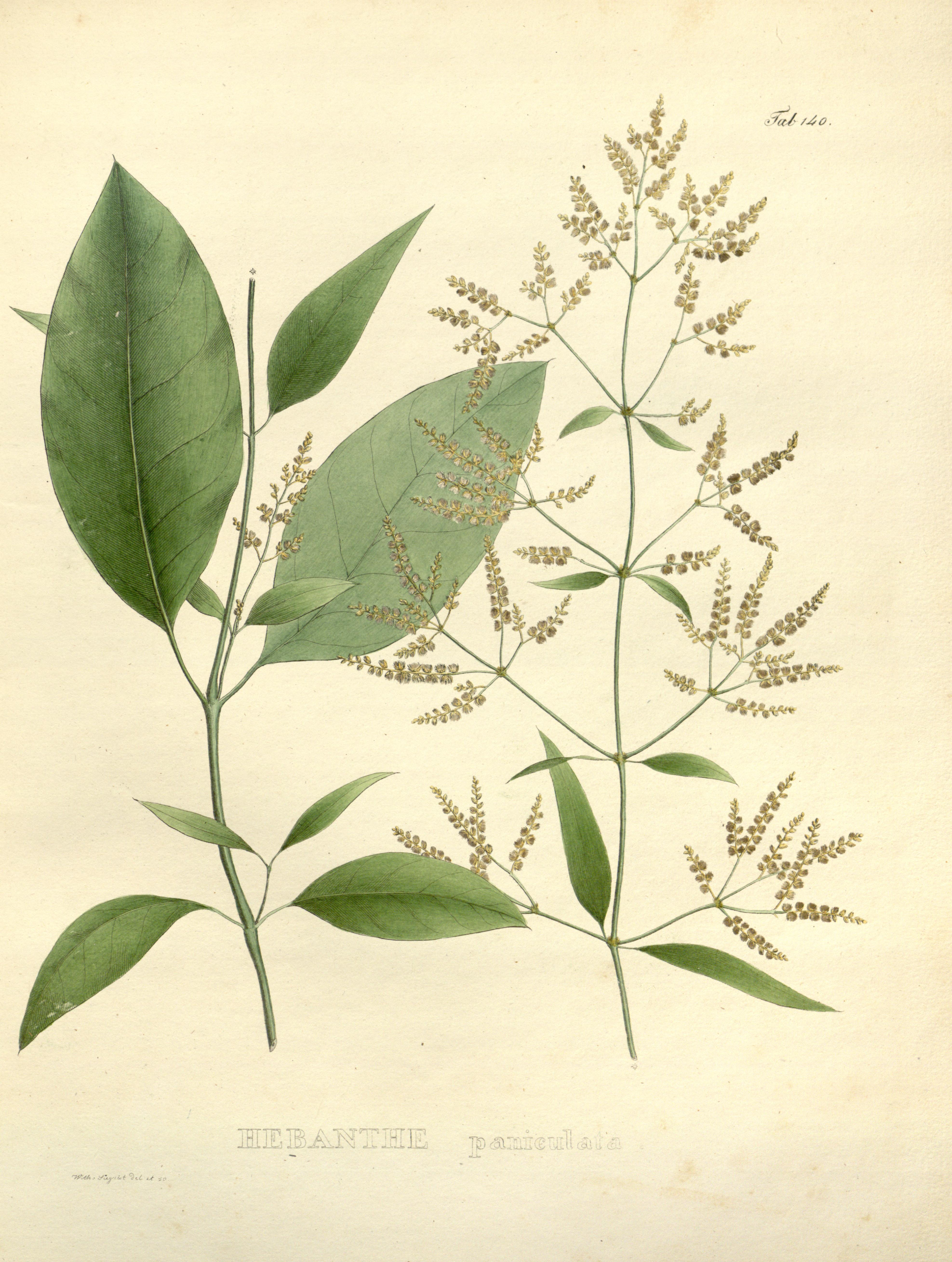
- Hebanthe erianthos

Scientific classification
- Kingdom: Plantae
- Clade: Embryophytes
- Clade: Tracheophytes
- Clade: Angiosperms
- Clade: Eudicots
- Order: Caryophyllales
- Family: Amaranthaceae
- Genus: Hebanthe; Mart.

Species
- See text.

Synonyms
- Hebeanthe Rchb.

= Hebanthe =

Genus of plants

Hebanthe is a genus of flowering plant in the family Amaranthaceae, native to Mexico to southern tropical America. The genus was first described by Carl von Martius.

== Species ==
As of April 2021, Plants of the World Online accepted the following species:

- Hebanthe erianthos (Poir.) Pedersen
- Hebanthe grandiflora (Hook.) Borsch & Pedersen
- Hebanthe occidentalis (R.E.Fr.) Borsch & Pedersen
- Hebanthe pulverulenta Mart.
- Hebanthe reticulata (Seub.) Borsch & Pedersen
- Hebanthe spicata Mart.
