= Turkesterone =

Chemical compound

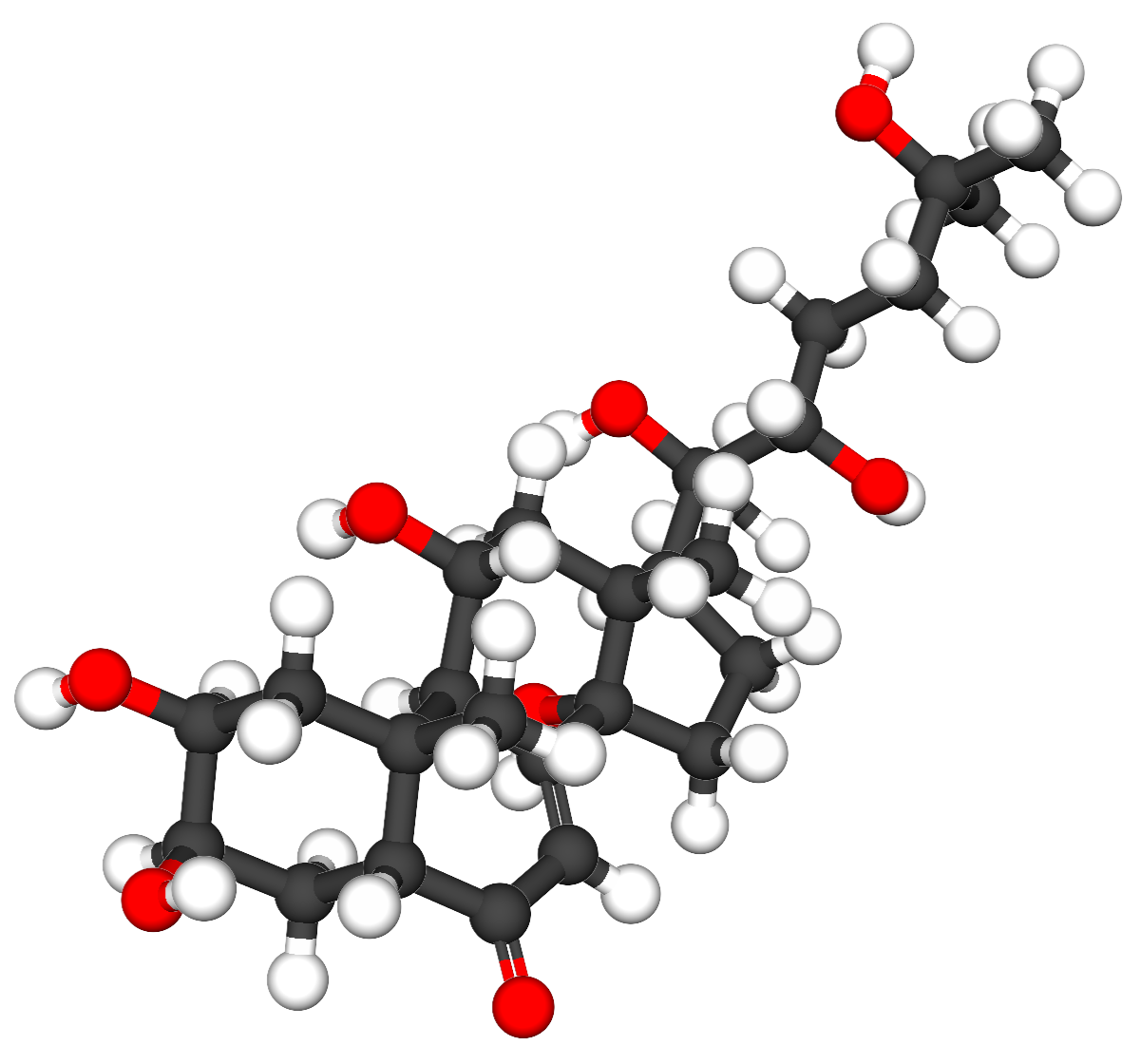

Identifiers
- IUPAC name: (2S,3R,5R,9R,10R,11R,13R,14S,17S)-2,3,11,14-Tetrahydroxy-10,13-dimethyl-17-[(2R,3R)-2,3,6-trihydroxy-6-methylheptan-2-yl]-2,3,4,5,9,11,12,15,16,17-decahydro-1H-cyclopenta[a]phenanthren-6-one
- CAS Number: 41451-87-0
- PubChem CID: 14376672
- ChemSpider: 10232962
- UNII: 53E6Z3F8ZG
- ChEMBL: ChEMBL2087140
- CompTox Dashboard (EPA): DTXSID50961697

Chemical and physical data
- Formula: C_{27}H_{44}O_{8}
- Molar mass: 496.641 g·mol^{−1}
- 3D model (JSmol): Interactive image
- SMILES: C[C@]12C[C@H]([C@H]3C(=CC(=O)[C@H]4[C@@]3(C[C@@H]([C@@H](C4)O)O)C)[C@@]1(CC[C@@H]2[C@](C)([C@@H](CCC(C)(C)O)O)O)O)O
- InChI: InChI=1S/C27H44O8/c1-23(2,33)8-7-21(32)26(5,34)20-6-9-27(35)15-11-16(28)14-10-17(29)18(30)12-24(14,3)22(15)19(31)13-25(20,27)4/h11,14,17-22,29-35H,6-10,12-13H2,1-5H3/t14-,17+,18-,19+,20-,21+,22+,24-,25+,26+,27+/m0/s1; Key:WSBAGDDNVWTLOM-XHZKDPLLSA-N

Turkesterone is a naturally occurring phytoecdysteroid, a subclass of ecdysteroids, which are steroidal compounds structurally related to cholesterol. It is predominantly found in numerous plant species.

== In plants ==
Turkesterone is found in diverse plants, including Ajuga turkestanica, various Vitex species, Triticum aestivum, Cyanotis arachnoidea and Rhaponticum acaule.

== Properties ==
Turkesterone has a polyhydroxylated structure with a cyclopentanoperhydrophenanthrene skeleton, resembling cholesterol-derived steroids.

Turkesterone is under laboratory research to determine if it has anabolic effects through the activation of the phosphoinositide 3-kinase and AKT signaling pathways.

Its pharmacokinetics, bioavailability, and possible effects in humans remain to be determined.

== See also ==
- Ecdysterone
