= Ajuga turkestanica =

Scientific classification
- Kingdom: Plantae
- Clade: Tracheophytes
- Clade: Angiosperms
- Clade: Eudicots
- Clade: Asterids
- Order: Lamiales
- Family: Lamiaceae
- Genus: Ajuga
- Species: A. turkestanica

Binomial name
- Ajuga turkestanica (Regel) Briq.

Synonyms
- Rosenbachia turkestanica Regel

Species of flowering plant

Ajuga turkestanica is a herbaceous flowering plant native to Tajikistan. It was first described in 1894.

== Description ==
A. turkestanica is a perennial herbaceous plant reaching heights between 40 and 60 cm. The plant is typically found in populations between 10 and 300, and appear more frequent within Artemisia complexes. The leaves are an elliptical oblong shape, straight-edged and with a pointed tip. It will flower between May and June. The flowers are small and located within the axil of two leaves. The fruit consists of four nuts, a characteristic of the Lamiaceae family, and emerges by the end of May.

== Distribution ==
A. turkestanica is native to the Pamir-Alay mountain ranges of Central Asia, notably within Tajikistan. It grows in rocky clay conditions up to elevations of approximately 2,500 m (8,200 ft).

== Uses ==
Although A. turkestanica, alongside many other Ajuga species, is claimed to have uses in folk medicine, there is no clinical evidence that A. turkestanica compounds have effects as a therapeutic in humans. An extract of A. turkestanica may be used as an ingredient in a topical skin cream.

Extracts of A. turkestanica are marketed on the Internet with the presumption they are useful as bodybuilding supplements. A. turkestanica contains ecdysteroid derivatives, such as turkesterone, although these compounds have no proven anabolic effects on muscle in mammals, and no approval as a drug in any country.
