= Phytoecdysteroid =

Plant defense chemical

Chemical structure of ecdysteroids, displaying the four contiguous rings characteristic of steroids. Ecdysone (top) and 20-hydroxyecdysone.

Phytoecdysteroids are plant-derived ecdysteroids. Phytoecdysteroids are a class of chemicals that plants synthesize for defense against phytophagous (plant eating) insects. These compounds are mimics of hormones used by arthropods in the molting process known as ecdysis. It is presumed that these chemicals act as endocrine disruptors for insects, so that when insects eat the plants with these chemicals they may prematurely molt, lose weight, or suffer other metabolic damage and die.

Chemically, phytoecdysteroids are classed as triterpenoids, the group of compounds that includes triterpene saponins, phytosterols, and phytoecdysteroids. Plants, but not animals, synthesize phytoecdysteroids from mevalonic acid in the mevalonate pathway of the plant cell using acetyl-CoA as a precursor.

Some ecdysteroids, including ecdysone and 20-hydroxyecdysone (20E), are produced by both plants and arthopods. Besides those, over 250 ecdysteroid analogs have been identified so far in plants, and it has been theorized that there are over 1,000 possible structures which might occur in nature. Many more plants have the ability to "turn on" the production of phytoecdysteroids when under stress, animal attack or other conditions.

The term phytoecdysteroid can also apply to ecdysteroids found in fungi, even though fungi are not plants. The more precise term mycoecdysteroid has been applied to these chemicals.

Some plants and fungi that produce phytoecdysteroids include Achyranthes bidentata, Tinospora cordifolia, Pfaffia paniculata, Leuzea carthamoides, Rhaponticum uniflorum, Serratula coronata, Cordyceps, and Asparagus.

== Effect on arthopods ==
It is generally believed that phytoecdysteroid exert a negative effect on pests. Indeed, phytoecdysteroids sprayed onto plants have been shown to reduce the infestation of nematodes and insects.

However, in very limited scenarios, phytoecdysteroids may end up becoming beneficial for the insect. For example, ginsenosides are able to activate the ecdysteroid receptor in fruit flies, but this activation happens to compensate for age-related reduction in 20E levels.

== Effect on plants ==
Phytoecdysteroids have also been reported to influence the germination of other plants, making it an allelochemical. The plant producing phytoecdysteroids may also be affected by ecdysteroids, mainly by increasing the rate of photosynthesis.

== Effect on mammals ==
They are not toxic to mammals and occur in the human diet. 20-hydroxyecdysone is a drug candidate, but this does not mean dietary amounts have any effect.

== See also ==
- Phytoandrogen
- Phytoestrogen
- Plant defense against herbivory
