= Ecdysis =

Shedding of the exoskeleton in arthropods and other invertebrates

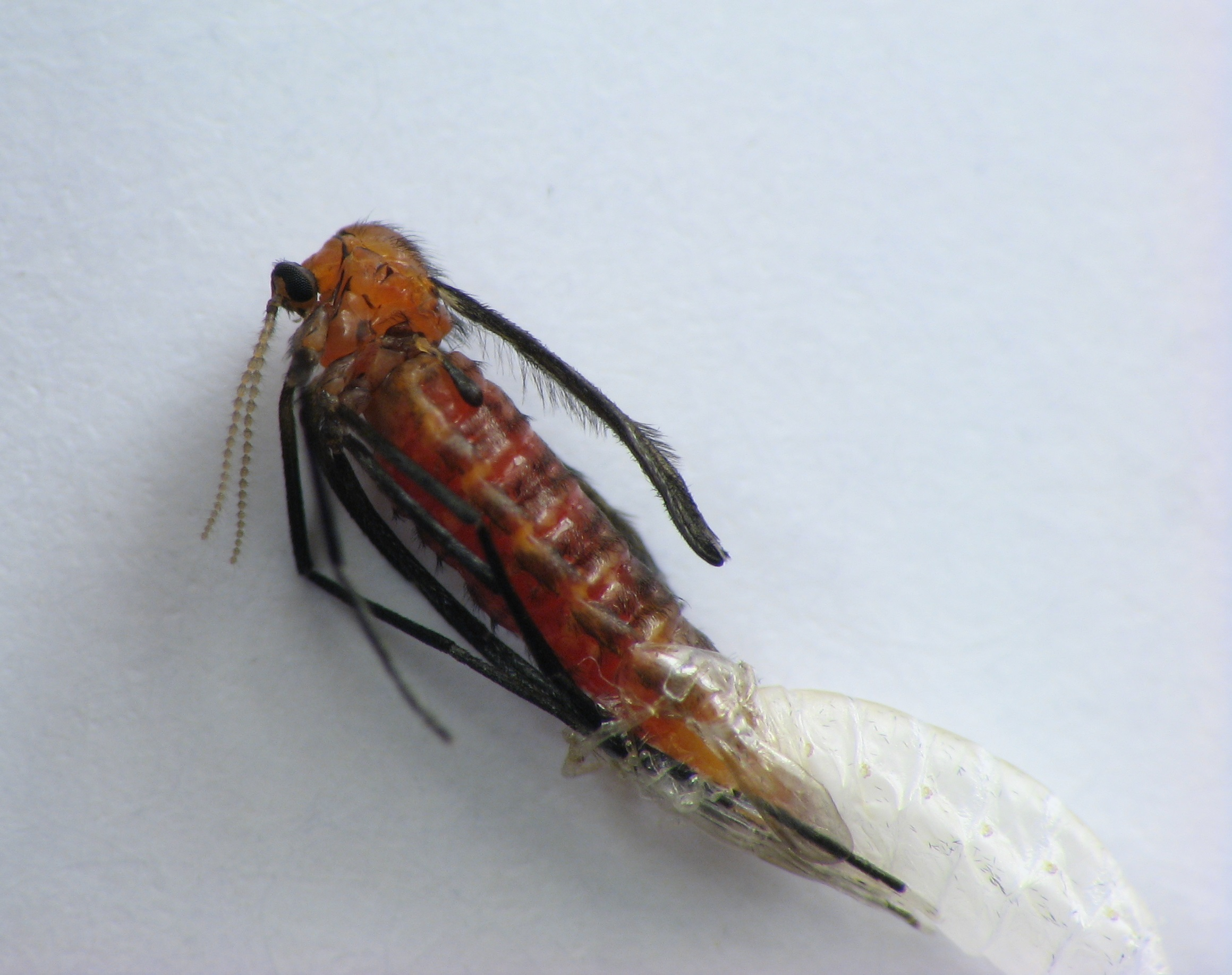
Adult Rhopalomyia solidaginis fly, emerging from pupal case

Process of ecdysis of a cicada.

Ecdysis is the moulting of the cuticle in many invertebrates of the clade Ecdysozoa. Since the cuticle of these animals typically forms a largely inelastic exoskeleton, it is shed during growth and a new, larger covering is formed. The remnants of the old, empty exoskeleton are called exuviae.

After moulting, an arthropod is described as teneral, a callow; it is "fresh", pale and soft-bodied. Within one or two hours, the cuticle hardens and darkens following a tanning process analogous to the production of leather. During this short phase the animal expands, since growth is otherwise constrained by the rigidity of the exoskeleton. Growth of the limbs and other parts normally covered by the hard exoskeleton is achieved by transfer of body fluids from soft parts before the new skin hardens. A spider with a small abdomen may be undernourished but more probably has recently undergone ecdysis. Some arthropods, especially large insects with tracheal respiration, expand their new exoskeleton by swallowing or otherwise taking in air. The maturation of the structure and colouration of the new exoskeleton might take days or weeks in a long-lived insect; this can make it difficult to identify an individual if it has recently undergone ecdysis.

Ecdysis allows damaged tissue and missing limbs to be regenerated or substantially re-formed. Complete regeneration may require a series of moults, the stump becoming a little larger with each moult until the limb is a normal, or near normal, size.

== Etymology ==
The term ecdysis comes from Ancient Greek ἐκδύω (ekduo) 'to take off, strip off'.

== Process ==
In preparation for ecdysis, the arthropod becomes inactive for a period of time, undergoing apolysis or separation of the old exoskeleton from the underlying epidermal cells. For most organisms, the resting period is a stage of preparation during which the secretion of fluid from the moulting glands of the epidermal layer and the loosening of the underpart of the cuticle occurs. Once the old cuticle has separated from the epidermis, a digesting fluid is secreted into the space between them. However, this fluid remains inactive until the upper part of the new cuticle has been formed. Then, by crawling movements, the organism pushes forward in the old integumentary shell, which splits down the back allowing the animal to emerge. Often, this initial crack is caused by a combination of movement and increase in pressure of hemolymph within the body, forcing an expansion across its exoskeleton, leading to an eventual crack that allows for certain organisms such as spiders to extricate themselves. While the old cuticle is being digested, the new layer is secreted. All cuticular structures are shed at ecdysis, including the inner parts of the exoskeleton, which includes terminal linings of the alimentary tract and of the tracheae if they are present.

Physiology of ecdysis
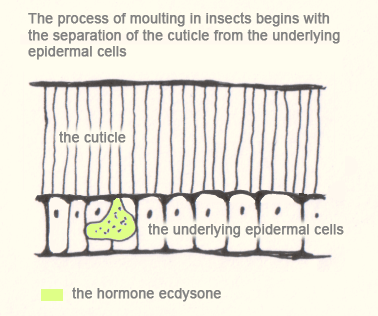
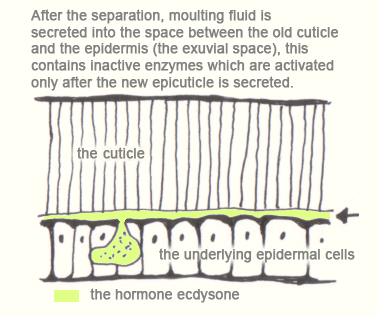
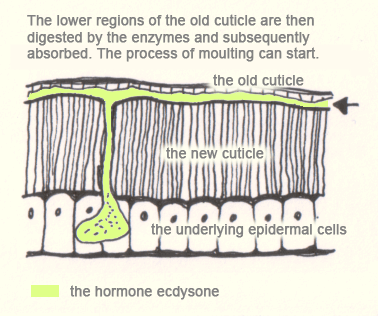

== Insects ==
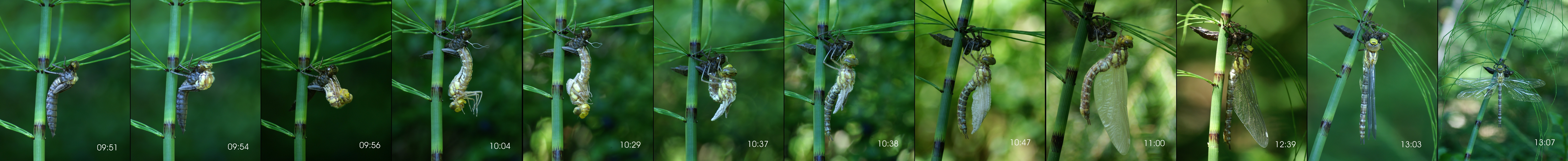
Moulting (ecdysis) in southern hawker, Aeshna cyanea

Each stage of development between moults for arthropods is called an instar, and the amount of time between moults is called a stadium. Each stage between moults of insects in the Exopterygota is called a nymph: there may be up to 15 nymphal stages. Endopterygota tend to have only four or five instars. Endopterygotes have more alternatives to moulting, such as expansion of the cuticle and collapse of air sacs to allow growth of internal organs.

The process of moulting in insects begins with the separation of the cuticle from the underlying epidermal cells (apolysis) and ends with the shedding of the old cuticle (ecdysis).

In many species, moulting is initiated by an increase in an ecdysteroid hormone such as ecdysone, 20-hydroxyecdysone, or turkesterone. This causes:

- apolysis – the separation of the cuticle from the epidermis
- secretion of new cuticle materials beneath the old
- degradation of the old cuticle

After apolysis the insect is known as a pharate. Moulting fluid is then secreted into the exuvial space between the old cuticle and the epidermis, this contains inactive enzymes which are activated only after the new epicuticle is secreted. This prevents the new procuticle from getting digested as it is laid down. The lower regions of the old cuticle, the endocuticle and mesocuticle, are then digested by the enzymes and subsequently absorbed. The exocuticle and epicuticle resist digestion and are hence shed at ecdysis.

== Spiders ==
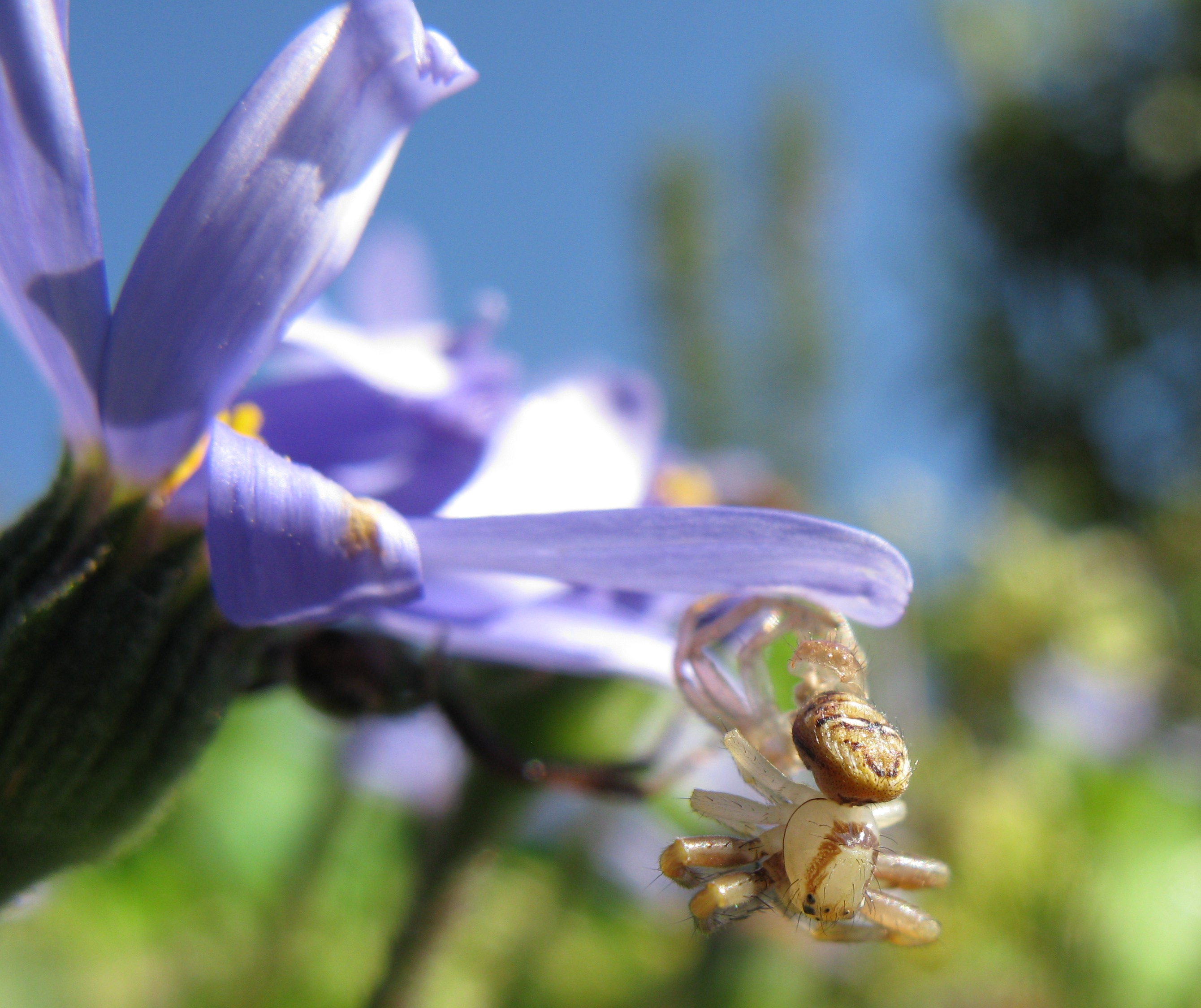
Female crab spider Synema decens, teneral after final ecdysis, still dangling from drop line, about to be mated, opisthosoma still shrunken

Complete process of a spider moulting.

Spiders generally change their skin for the first time while still inside the egg sac, and the spiderling that emerges broadly resembles the adult. The number of moults varies, both between species and sexes, but generally will be between five times and nine times before the spider reaches maturity. As a result of sexual dimorphism, male spiders, which grow to a smaller size than their female counterparts, often undergo ecdysis less than a female spider of the same species. Members of the infraorder Mygalomorphae are very long-lived, sometimes 20 years or more; they moult annually even after they mature.

Spiders stop feeding at some time before moulting, usually for several days. The physiological processes of releasing the old exoskeleton from the tissues beneath typically cause various colour changes, such as darkening and tanning. If the old exoskeleton is not too thick it may be possible to see new structures, such as setae, from the outside. However, contact between the nerves and the old exoskeleton is maintained until a very late stage in the process.

The new, teneral exoskeleton has to accommodate a larger frame than the previous instar, while the spider has had to fit into the previous exoskeleton until it has been shed. This means the spider does not fill out the new exoskeleton completely, so it commonly appears somewhat wrinkled.

Most species of spiders hang from silk during the entire process, either dangling from a drop line, or fastening their claws into webbed fibres attached to a suitable base. The discarded, dried exoskeleton typically remains hanging where it was abandoned once the spider has left.

To open the old exoskeleton, the spider generally contracts its abdomen (opisthosoma) to supply enough fluid to pump into the prosoma with sufficient pressure to crack it open along its lines of weakness. The carapace lifts off from the front, like a helmet, as its surrounding skin ruptures, but it remains attached at the back. Now the spider works its limbs free and typically winds up dangling by a new thread of silk attached to its own exuviae, which in turn hang from the original silk attachment.

At this point the spider is a callow; it is teneral and vulnerable. As it dangles, its exoskeleton hardens and takes shape. The process may take minutes in small spiders, or some hours in the larger Mygalomorphs. Some spiders, such as some Synema species, members of the Thomisidae (crab spiders), mate while the female is still callow, during which time she is unable to eat the male.

== Eurypterids ==
Eurypterids are a group of chelicerates that became extinct in the Late Permian. They underwent ecdysis similarly to extant chelicerates, and most fossils are thought to be of exuviae, rather than cadavers.
