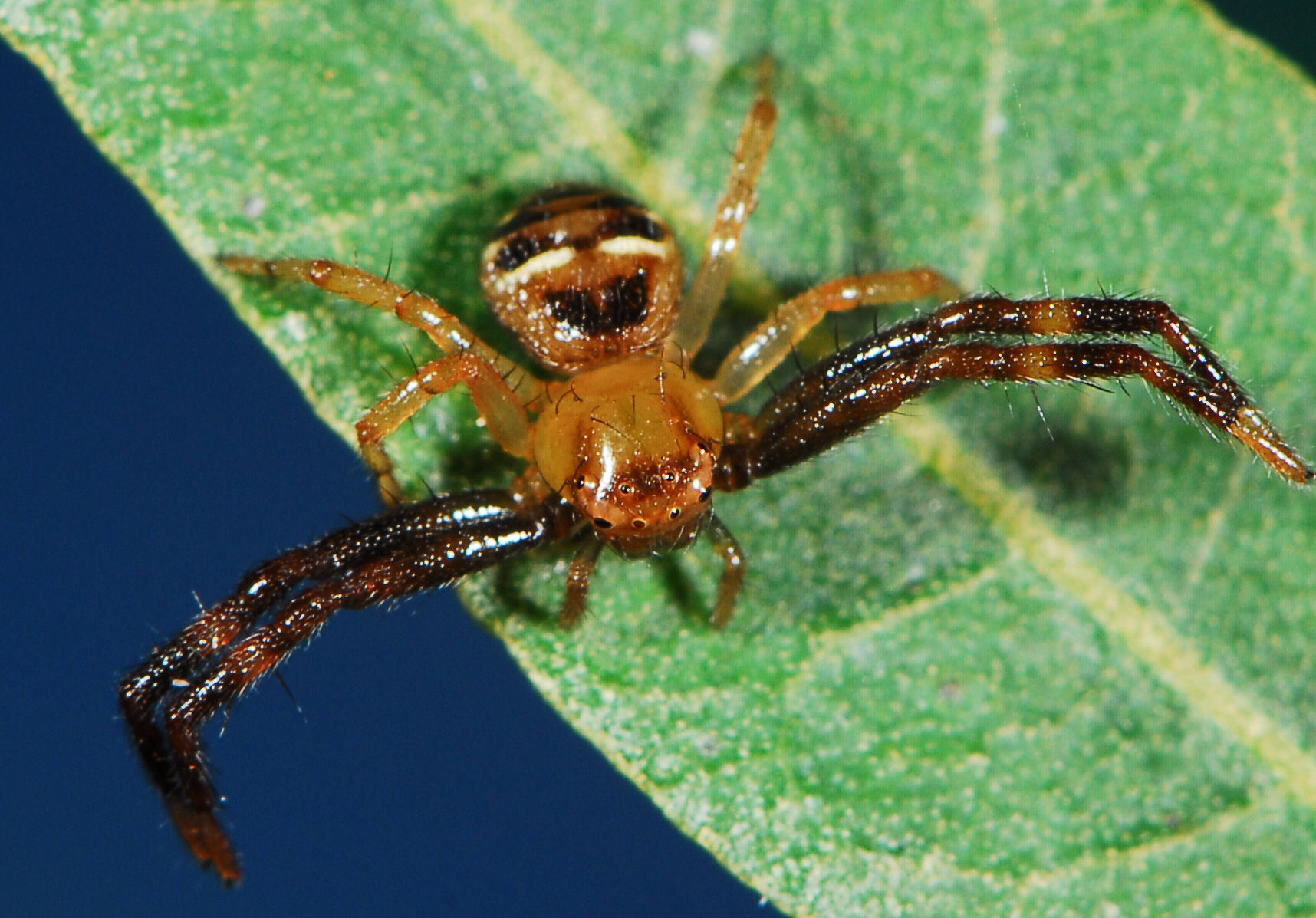
- female from South Africa
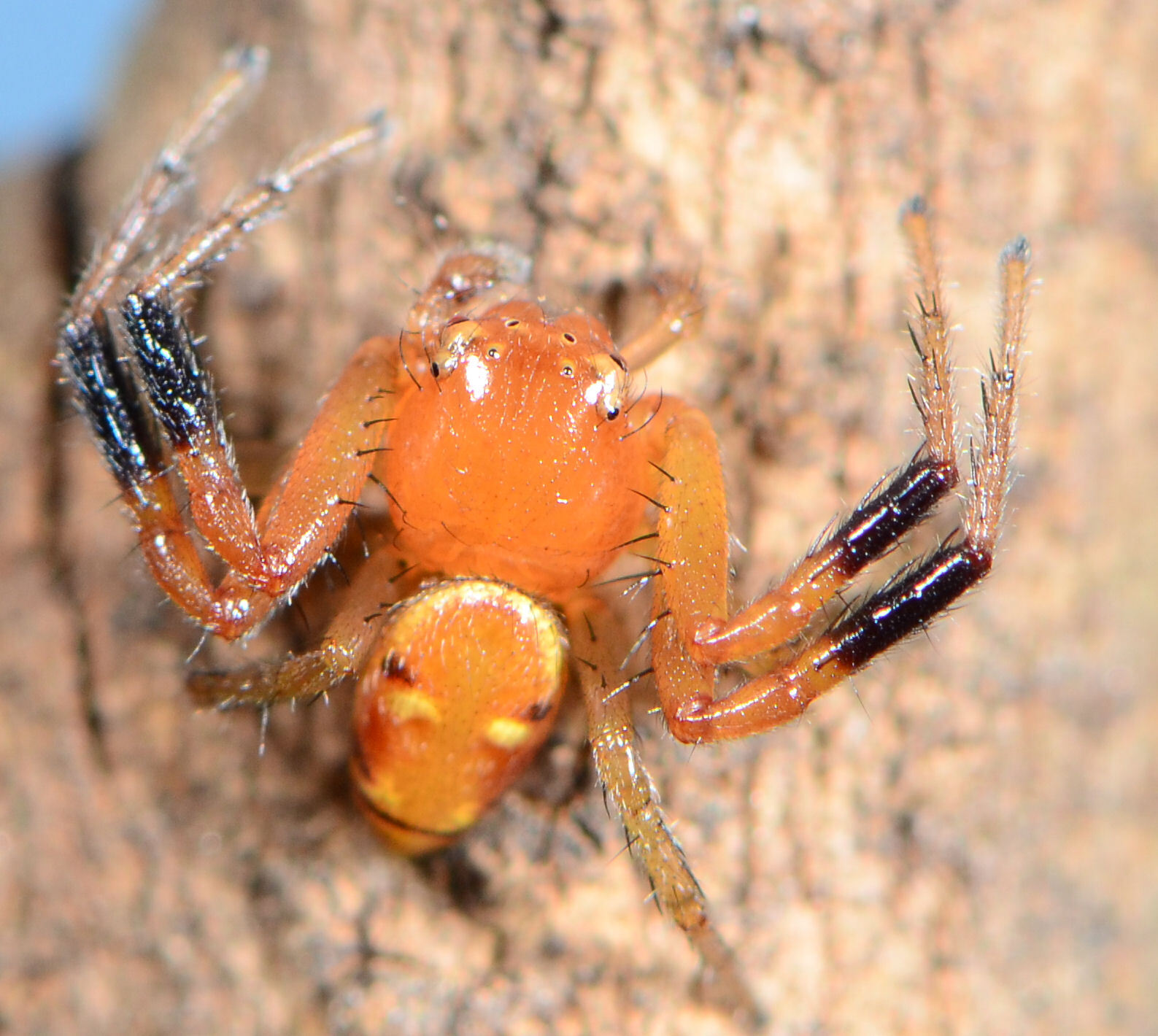
- male from South Africa

Scientific classification
- Kingdom: Animalia
- Phylum: Arthropoda
- Subphylum: Chelicerata
- Class: Arachnida
- Order: Araneae
- Infraorder: Araneomorphae
- Family: Thomisidae
- Genus: Synema
- Species: S. decens

Binomial name
- Synema decens (Karsch, 1878)

Synonyms
- Diaea decens Karsch, 1878

= Synema decens =

Spotted African masked crab spider

Species of crab spider

Synema decens is a species of crab spider in the family Thomisidae. It is endemic to southern Africa, where it is known from South Africa and Eswatini (formerly Swaziland). The species is commonly known as the spotted African mask crab spider.

== Taxonomy ==
The species was originally described by German arachnologist Ferdinand Karsch in 1878 as Diaea decens, based on a female specimen from Port Natal (now Durban) in KwaZulu-Natal. In 1907, Friedrich Dahl redescribed the species and described the male, placing it in the genus Synaema. It was later transferred to its current placement in Synema.

The holotype female specimen is deposited in the Museum für Naturkunde, Berlin.

== Distribution ==
Synema decens is widely distributed across South Africa, having been recorded from eight of the nine provinces. It occurs from sea level to elevations of 1,692 metres above sea level.

In South Africa, the species has been recorded from the Eastern Cape, Gauteng, KwaZulu-Natal, Limpopo, Mpumalanga, Northern Cape, North West, and Western Cape provinces. Notable localities include Addo Elephant National Park, Kruger National Park, Mkuze Game Reserve, and De Hoop Nature Reserve.

== Habitat ==
Synema decens is a free-living spider found on vegetation and occasionally inside flower corollas. The species has been recorded from all major South African floral biomes except the Desert, Nama-Karoo, and Succulent Karoo biomes. It has also been found in agricultural settings, including citrus groves, cotton fields, and tomato crops.

== Description ==
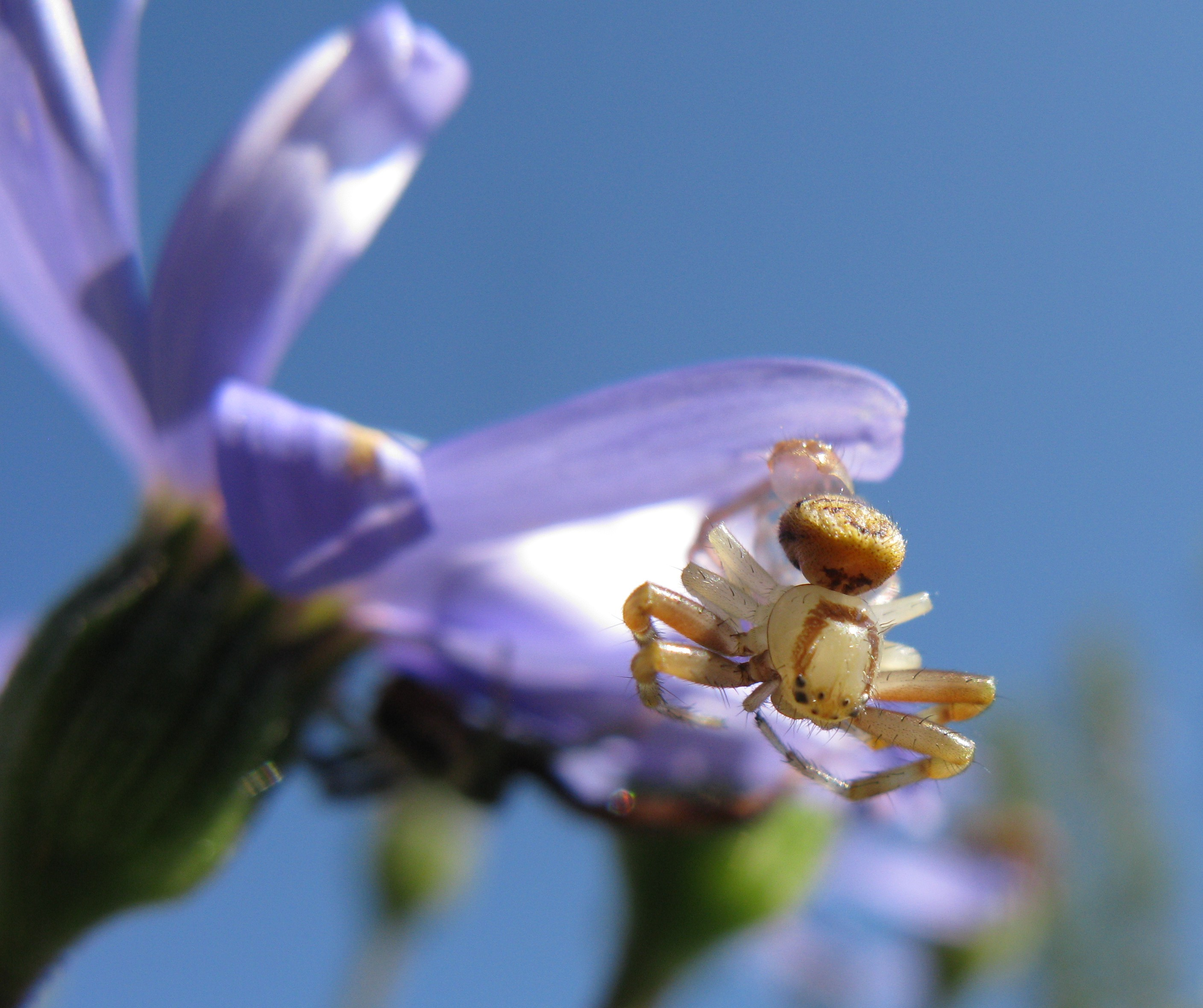
female

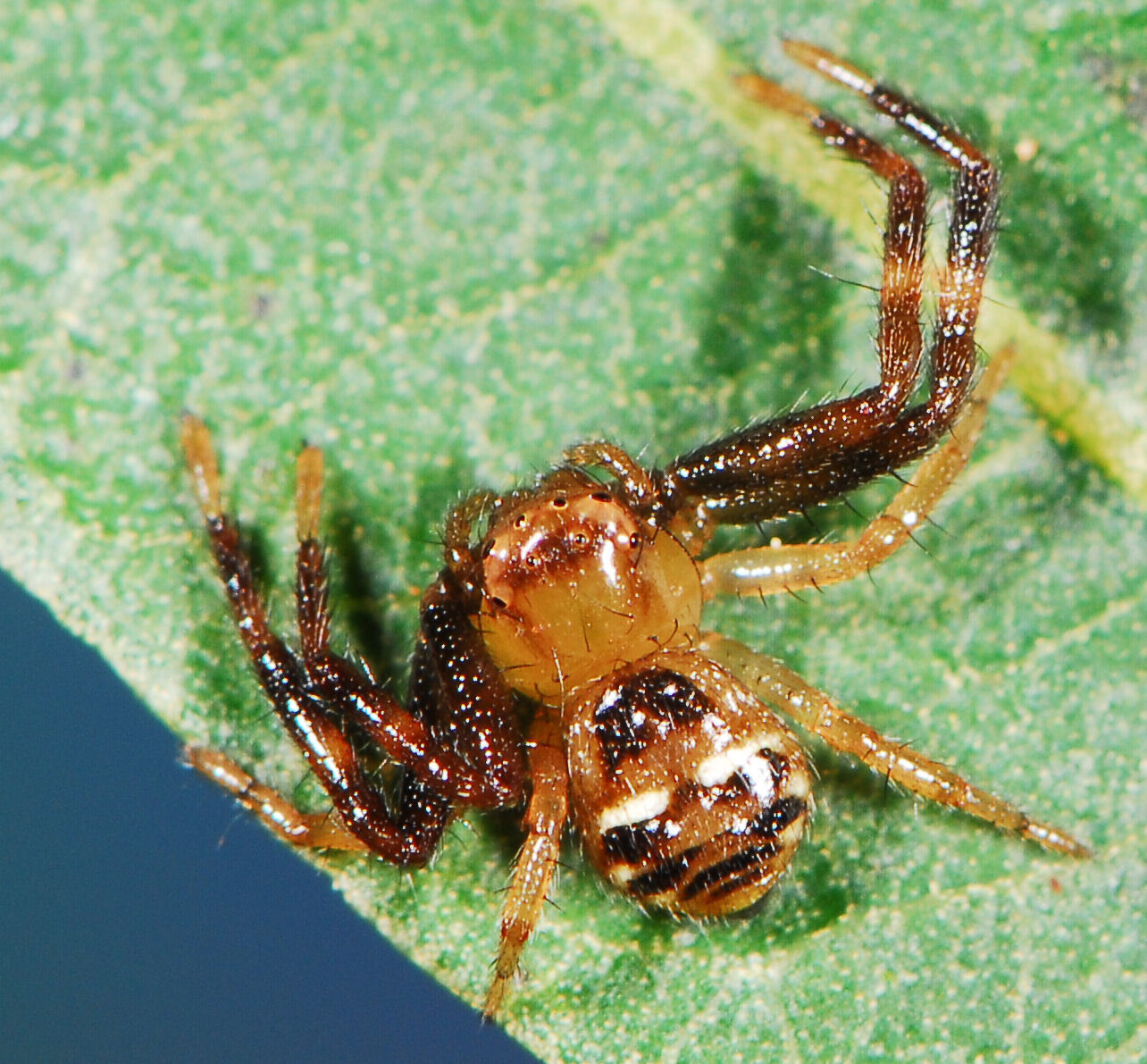
female

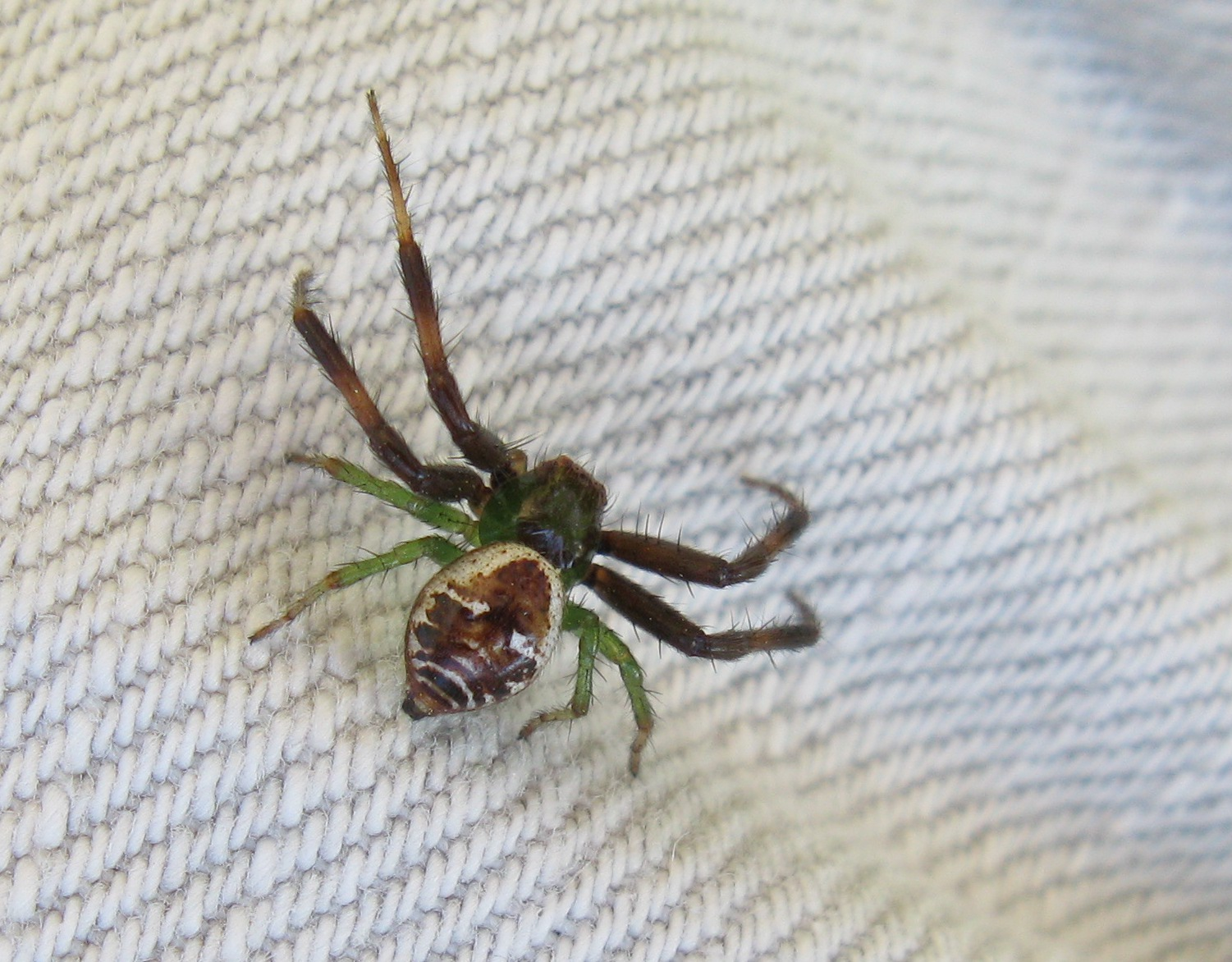
male

The original description by Karsch noted that females have a body length of 3–4 mm. The general coloration is described as a dull brownish-grey. The cephalothorax and the pedipalps and legs, which bear fine black spines, are more translucent yellowish-brown.

The eyes of the first row appear slightly convex when viewed from the front, while those of the second row are more strongly curved. The four median eyes form a narrow trapezoid at the front, with the anterior and posterior lateral eyes positioned wider apart than the anterior and posterior median eyes respectively.

The opisthosoma is slightly domed, with the sides of the back finely dotted with dense white spots. A pair of impressed black points lies in front of the middle, with two almost confluent points in the median line somewhat forward and curved, followed by white-spotted black transverse stripes.

== Conservation status ==
Synema decens is listed as Least Concern due to its wide geographical range across southern Africa. The species has been recorded in more than 16 protected areas and faces no known significant threats. No specific conservation actions are recommended for this species.
