= Apolysis =

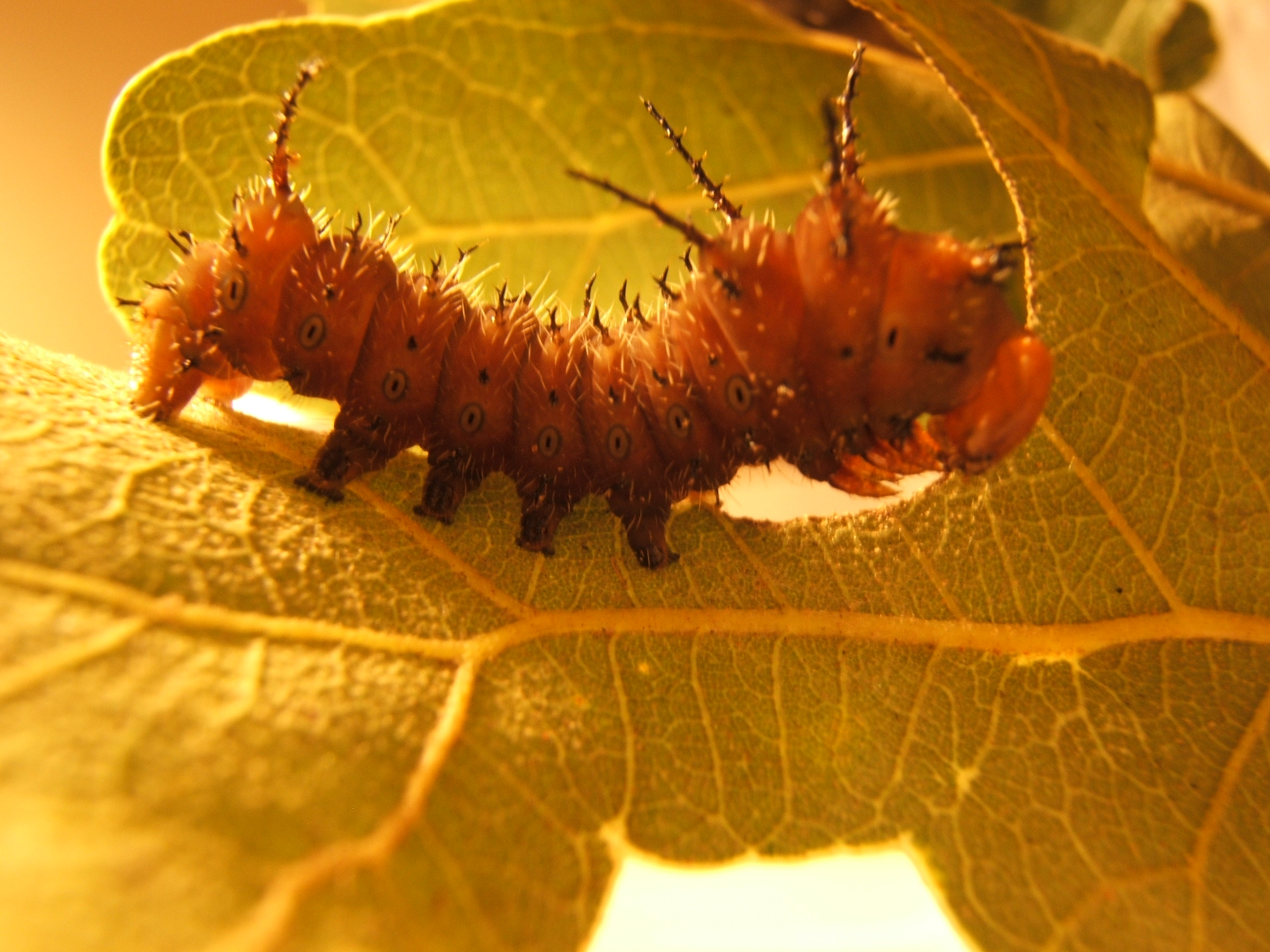
Eacles imperialis caterpillar undergoing apolysis

Apolysis (Ancient Greek: ἀπόλυσις "discharge, lit. absolution") is the separation of the cuticle from the epidermis in arthropods and related groups (Ecdysozoa). Since the cuticle of these animals is also the skeletal support of the body and is inelastic, it is shed during growth and a new covering of larger dimensions is formed. During this process, an arthropod becomes dormant for a period of time. Enzymes are secreted to digest the inner layers of the existing cuticle, detaching the animal from the outer cuticle. This allows the new cuticle to develop without being exposed to the environmental elements.

After apolysis, ecdysis occurs. Ecdysis is the actual emergence of the arthropod into the environment and always occurs directly after apolysis. The newly emerged animal then hardens and continues its life.
