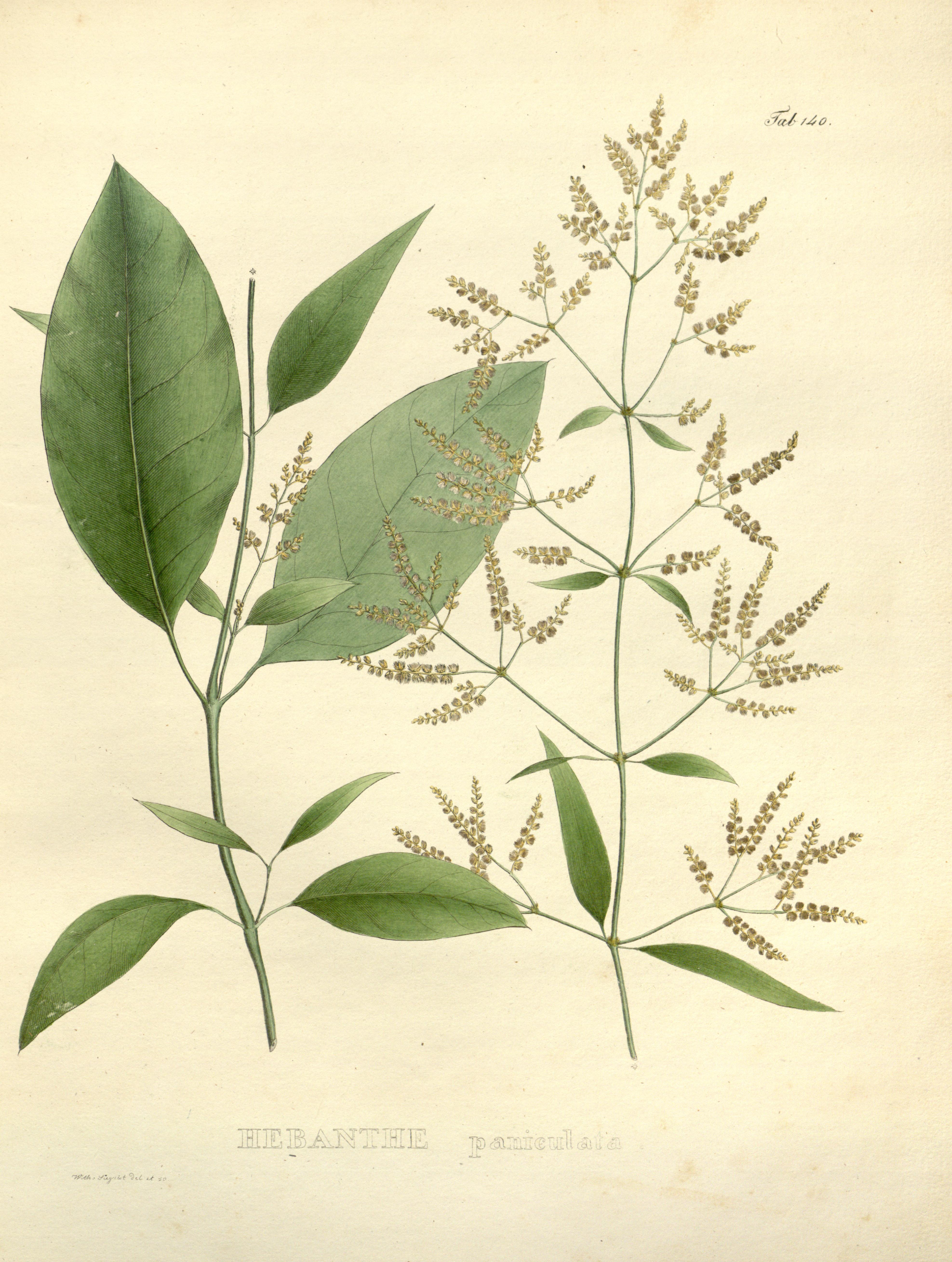

Scientific classification
- Kingdom: Plantae
- Clade: Tracheophytes
- Clade: Angiosperms
- Clade: Eudicots
- Order: Caryophyllales
- Family: Amaranthaceae
- Genus: Hebanthe
- Species: H. erianthos

Binomial name
- Hebanthe erianthos (Poir.) Pedersen

Synonyms
- Celosia eriantha Vahl ex Moq.; Gomphrena erianthos (Poir.) Moq.; Gomphrena paniculata (Mart.) Moq.; Gomphrena paniculata f. ovatifolia Heimerl; Hebanthe paniculata Mart.; Hebanthe paniculata f. ovatifolia (Heimerl) Borsch & Pedersen; Hebanthe virgata Mart.; Iresine erianthos Poir.; Iresine paniculata (Mart.) Spreng.; Iresine tenuis Suess.; Iresine virgata Spreng.; Pfaffia erianthos (Poir.) Kuntze; Pfaffia laurifolia Chodat; Pfaffia paniculata (Mart.) Kuntze; Pfaffia paniculata f. lanceolata R.E.Fr.; Pfaffia paraguayensis Chodat; Xeraea paniculata (Mart.) Kuntze

= Hebanthe erianthos =

Species of plant

Hebanthe erianthos (many synonyms, including Iresine erianthos and Pfaffia paniculata), known as suma or Brazilian ginseng, is a species of plant in the family Amaranthaceae. The specific epithet is also spelt "eriantha", although the basionym is Iresine erianthos.

The root of this rambling ground vine found in South America is used traditionally as a medicine and tonic. Nicknamed "para tudo" in Brasil, which means "for everything", suma is a traditional herbal medicine.

The root contains phytochemicals including saponins (pfaffosides).

== See also ==
- List of plants of Cerrado vegetation of Brazil
