= Corpus allatum =

In insect physiology, an endocrine gland that generates juvenile hormones

In insect physiology and anatomy, the corpus allatum (plural: corpora allata) is an endocrine gland that generates juvenile hormone; as such, it plays a crucial role in metamorphosis. Surgical removal of the corpora allata (an allatectomy) can cause an immature larva to pupate at its next molt, resulting in a miniature adult. Similarly, transplantation of corpora allata from a young larva to a fully mature larva can greatly extend the larval stage, resulting in an equivalent to gigantism.

In many Diptera species, the corpus allatum is fused with the corpus cardiacum, forming a "ring gland", also known as Weismann's ring.

In Lepidoptera species, the corpus allatum acts as a release site for prothoracicotropic hormone which is generated by the brain.
