= 20-Hydroxyecdysone =

Chemical compound

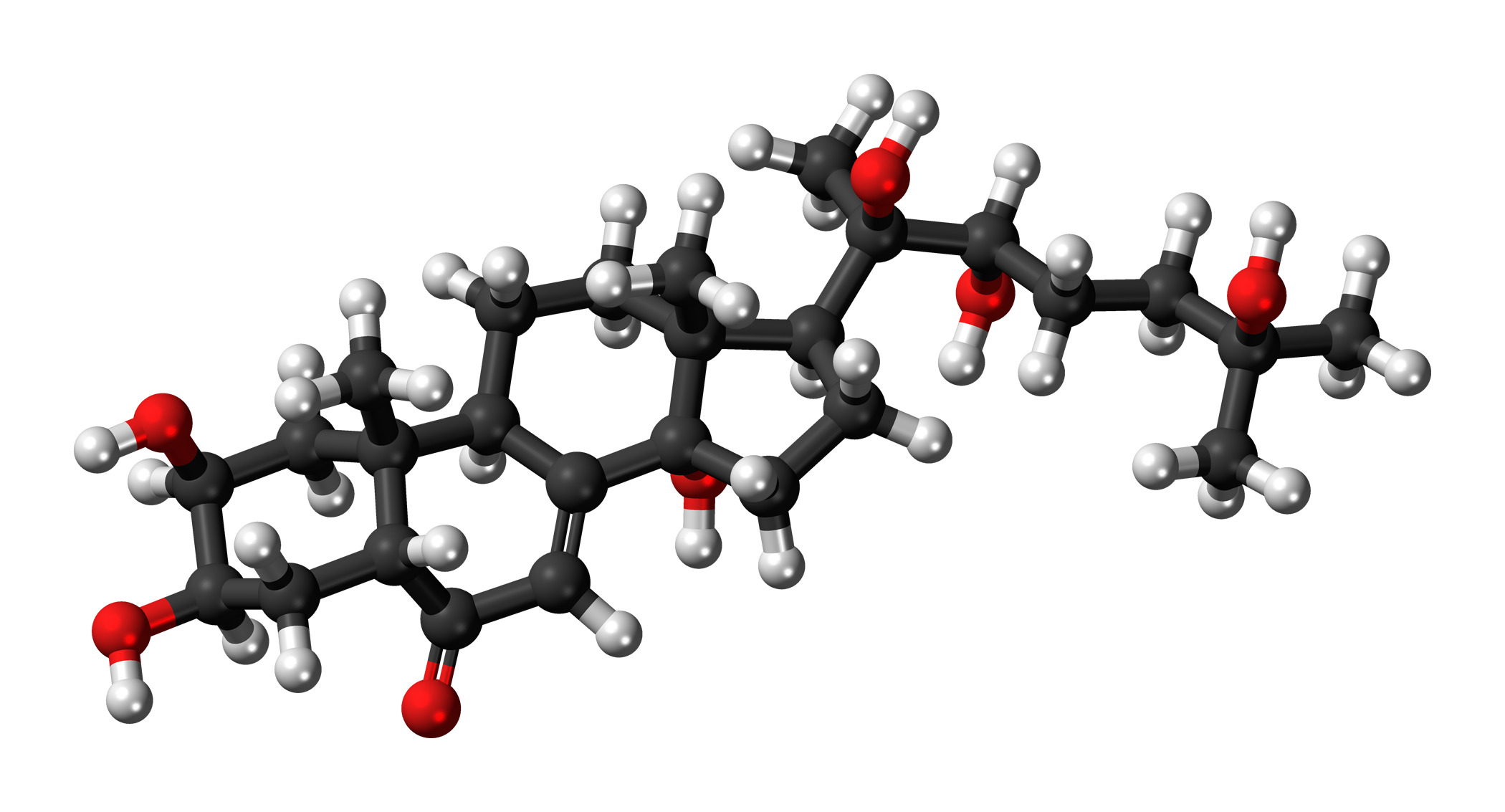

Clinical data
- Other names: BIO101, Ecdysterone
- Pregnancy category: unknown
- Routes of administration: Oral

Legal status
- Legal status: US: OTC; Not a regulated substance in general

Pharmacokinetic data
- Metabolism: Hepatic
- Elimination half-life: 4-9 hours

Identifiers
- IUPAC name: (2β,3β,5β,22R)-2,3,14,20,22,25-Hexahydroxycholest-7-en-6-one
- CAS Number: 5289-74-7
- PubChem CID: 5459840
- ChemSpider: 4573597
- UNII: 779A7KPL0Y
- ChEBI: CHEBI:16587
- ChEMBL: ChEMBL224128
- CompTox Dashboard (EPA): DTXSID5040388
- ECHA InfoCard: 100.241.312

Chemical and physical data
- Formula: C_{27}H_{44}O_{7}
- Molar mass: 480.642 g·mol^{−1}
- 3D model (JSmol): Interactive image
- SMILES: O=C1\C=C3/[C@@H]([C@]2(C[C@H](O)[C@H](O)C[C@@H]12)C)CC[C@]4([C@@]3(O)CC[C@@H]4[C@](O)(C)[C@H](O)CCC(O)(C)C)C
- InChI: InChI=1S/C27H44O7/c1-23(2,32)9-8-22(31)26(5,33)21-7-11-27(34)16-12-18(28)17-13-19(29)20(30)14-24(17,3)15(16)6-10-25(21,27)4/h12,15,17,19-22,29-34H,6-11,13-14H2,1-5H3/t15-,17-,19+,20-,21-,22+,24+,25+,26+,27+/m0/s1; Key:NKDFYOWSKOHCCO-YPVLXUMRSA-N

20-Hydroxyecdysone (ecdysterone or 20E) is a naturally occurring ecdysteroid hormone which controls the ecdysis (moulting) and metamorphosis of arthropods. It is therefore one of the most common moulting hormones in insects, crabs, etc. Also phytoecdysteroid produced by and extracted from various plants, including Cyanotis vaga, Ajuga turkestanica and Rhaponticum carthamoides, it is thought to be a plant defense against herbivory that disrupts the reproduction of insect pests.

In arthropods, 20-hydroxyecdysone acts through the ecdysone receptor. Although mammals (including humans) lack this receptor, 20-hydroxyecdysone affects mammalian biological systems. 20-Hydroxyecdysone is an ingredient of some supplements that aim to enhance physical performance. In mammals, it is hypothesized to bind to the estrogen receptor beta (ERβ) protein.

== Sources in arthropods ==
The primary sources of 20-hydroxyecdysone in larvae are the prothoracic gland, ring gland, gut, and fat bodies. These tissues convert dietary cholesterol into the mature forms of the hormone 20-hydroxyecdysone. For the most part, these glandular tissues are lost in the adult, with exception of the fat body, which is retained as a sheath of lipid tissue surrounding the brain and organs of the abdomen. In the adult female, the ovary is a substantial source of 20-hydroxyecdysone production. Adult males are left with, so far as is currently known, one source of 20-hydroxyecdysone, which is the fat body tissue. These hormone-producing tissues express the ecdysone receptor throughout development, possibly indicating a functional feedback mechanism.

== Ecdysteroid activity in arthropods ==
In insects, an ecdysteroid is a type of steroid hormone derived from enzymatic modification of cholesterol by p450 enzymes. This occurs by a mechanism similar to steroid synthesis in vertebrates. Ecdysone and 20-hydroxyecdysone regulate larval molts, onset of puparium formation, and metamorphosis. As these hormones are hydrophobic, they traverse lipid membranes and permeate the tissues of an organism. Indeed, the ecdysone receptor is an intracellular protein.

== In humans and other mammals ==
=== Use as research tool ===
20-Hydroxyecdysone and other ecdysteroids are used in biochemistry research as inducers in transgenic animals, whereby a new gene is introduced into an animal so that its expression is under the control of an introduced ecdysone receptor. Adding or removing ecdysteroids from the animal's diet then gives a convenient way to turn the inserted gene on or off. At usual doses, 20-hydroxyecdysone appears to have little or no effect on animals that do not have extra genes inserted. Given its high oral bioavailability, therefore, it is useful for determining whether the transgene has been taken up effectively. However, studies mentioned below show that 20E is not totally inert in non-transgenic mammals.

=== Use as supplement ===
20-Hydroxyecdysone and other ecdysteroids are marketed as ingredients in nutritional supplements for various sports, particularly bodybuilding. Although a number of early studies supported the anabolic effects of 20-hydroxyecdysone, a 2006 study concluded that the use of 30 mg per day of 20-hydroxyecdysone administered orally did not significantly affect anabolic or catabolic responses to resistance training, body composition, or training adaptations. However, a 2019 study found significantly higher increases in muscle mass and one-repetition bench press performance in participants dosed with ecdysterone. The study, funded by the World Anti-Doping Agency, demonstrated a significant dose-responsive anabolic effect. Other studies have elucidated the mechanism of action of 20-hydroxyecdysone on human muscle cells, which appears to involve relatively selective activation of estrogen receptor beta (ERβ), known to result in muscle hypertrophy. It has recently been identified as a MAS1 agonist as well.

=== Drug development ===
In 2024, the Food and Drug Administration approved a study on the efficacy of 20-hydroxyecdysone in treating obesity, focusing on muscle strength improvement in the lower limbs.
