= Prothoracic gland =

Glands in the prothorax of certain insects

The prothoracic glands are either of a pair of endocrine glands located in the prothorax of certain insects that regulate molting. They have an ectodermal origin and secrete ecdysteroids, such as ecdysone and 20-hydroxyecdysone. They usually disappear in adults.
