= Ecdysone =

Precursor of an insect hormone

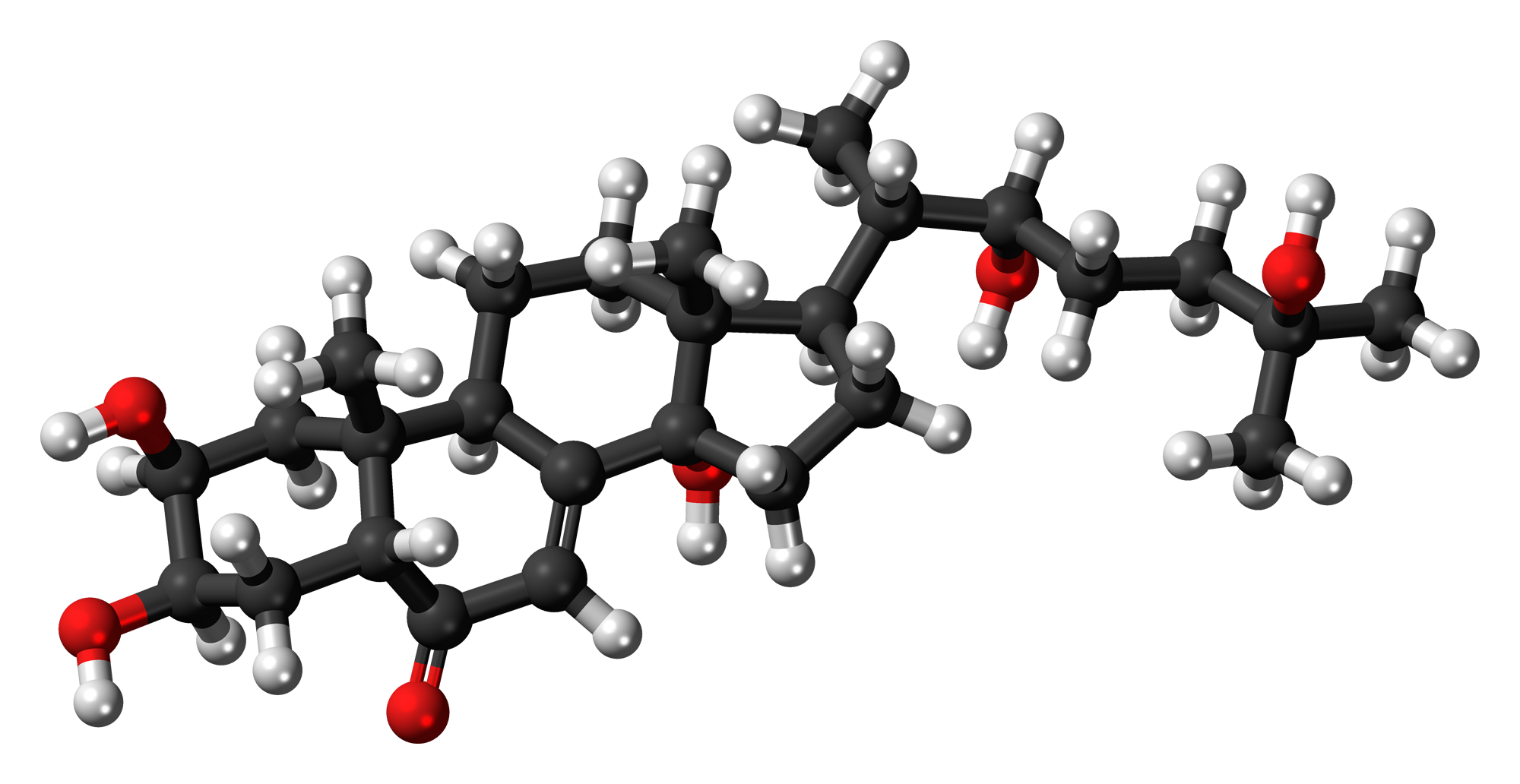

Names
- IUPAC name (22R)-2β,3β,14α,22,25-Pentahydroxy-5β-cholest-7-en-6-one
- Systematic IUPAC name (1R,3aS,5aR,7R,8S,9aR,9bR,11aR)-1-[(2S,3R)-3,6-Dihydroxy-6-methylheptan-2-yl]-3a,7,8-trihydroxy-9a,11a-dimethyl-1,2,3,3a,5a,6,7,8,9,9a,9b,10,11,11a-tetradecahydro-5H-cyclopenta[a]phenanthren-5-one

Identifiers
CAS Number	3604-87-3
3D model (JSmol)	Interactive image
ChEBI	CHEBI:16688
ChEMBL	ChEMBL549300
ChemSpider	18130
ECHA InfoCard	100.020.692
PubChem CID	19212
UNII	RH692X7B7B
CompTox Dashboard (EPA)	DTXSID2020553
- InChI: InChI=1S/C27H44O6/c1-15(20(28)8-9-24(2,3)32)16-7-11-27(33)18-12-21(29)19-13-22(30)23(31)14-25(19,4)17(18)6-10-26(16,27)5/h12,15-17,19-20,22-23,28,30-33H,6-11,13-14H2,1-5H3/t15-,16+,17-,19-,20+,22+,23-,25+,26+,27+/m0/s1 Key: UPEZCKBFRMILAV-JMZLNJERSA-N; InChI=1/C27H44O6/c1-15(20(28)8-9-24(2,3)32)16-7-11-27(33)18-12-21(29)19-13-22(30)23(31)14-25(19,4)17(18)6-10-26(16,27)5/h12,15-17,19-20,22-23,28,30-33H,6-11,13-14H2,1-5H3/t15-,16+,17-,19-,20+,22+,23-,25+,26+,27+/m0/s1 Key: UPEZCKBFRMILAV-JMZLNJERBR
- SMILES: O=C1\C=C3/[C@@H]([C@]2(C[C@H](O)[C@H](O)C[C@@H]12)C)CC[C@]4([C@@]3(O)CC[C@@H]4[C@H](C)[C@H](O)CCC(O)(C)C)C

Properties
Chemical formula	C_{27}H_{44}O_{6}
Molar mass	464.63 g/mol
- Except where otherwise noted, data are given for materials in their standard state (at 25 °C [77 °F], 100 kPa). verify (what is ?) Infobox references

Ecdysone is the prohormone of the major insect molting hormone 20-hydroxyecdysone, secreted from the prothoracic glands. It is of steroidal structure. Insect molting hormones (ecdysone and its homologues) are generally called ecdysteroids. Ecdysteroids act as moulting hormones of arthropods but also occur in other related phyla where they can play different roles. In Drosophila melanogaster, an increase in ecdysone concentration induces the expression of genes coding for proteins that the larva requires. It causes chromosome puffs (sites of high expression) to form in polytene chromosomes. Recent findings in the laboratory of Chris Q. Doe have found a novel role of this hormone in regulating temporal gene transitions within neural stem cells of the fruit fly.

Ecdysone turns into 20-hydroxyecdysone by the activity of ecdysone 20-monooxygenase, which requires molecular oxygen and a reduced hydrogen acceptor (NADPH).

Ecdysone and other ecdysteroids also appear in many plants mostly as a protection agent (toxins or antifeedants) against herbivorous insects. Some phytoecdysteroids may be bioactive in human contexts such as n ecdysteroid precursor from Stachyurus himalaicus, which exhibits cytotoxicity Ecdysones from insects have also exhibited antioxidant properties on lipid peroxidation. Ecdysteroids are also found in the purport adaptogen Cordyceps militaris.

Tebufenozide, sold under the Bayer trademark MIMIC, has ecdysteroid activity although it bears little resemblance to the ecdysteroids.

== See also ==
- Ecdysone receptor
- PTTH - Metamorphosis Initiator hormone
