= Ecdysteroid =

Group of steroid hormones

Chemical structures of ecdysteroids, ecdysone (top) and 20-hydroxyecdysone

Ecdysteroids are arthropod steroid hormones that are mainly responsible for molting (ecdysis), development and, to a lesser extent, reproduction; examples of ecdysteroids include ecdysone, 20-hydroxyecdysone (ecdysterone), turkesterone and 2-deoxyecdysone. These compounds are synthesized in arthropods from dietary cholesterol via the Halloween family of cytochrome P450 enzymes.

Compounds with ecdysteroid activity in arthropods are not only produced by these animals (zooecdysteroids). Phytoecdysteroids appear in many plants, mostly as protection agents (toxins or antifeedants) against herbivorous insects. Fungi produce a handful of mycoecdysteroids. In addition, synthetic ecdysteroid pesticides such as methoxyfenozide have been produced.

== Supposed dietary supplements ==
Extracts of A. turkestanica, including ecdysteroid, are marketed on the Internet with the presumption they are useful as bodybuilding supplements. A. turkestanica contains ecdysteroid derivatives, such as turkesterone, although these compounds have no proven anabolic effects on muscle in mammals, and no approval as a drug in any country.

== See also ==
- Ecdysone receptor
