= Insect morphology =

Description of the physical form of insects

Insect morphology Legend of body parts Tagmata: A – Head, B – Thorax, C – Abdomen.: 1. antenna; 2. ocelli (lower); 3. ocelli (upper); 4. compound eye; 5. brain (cerebral ganglia); 6. prothorax; 7. dorsal blood vessel; 8. tracheal tubes (trunk with spiracle); 9. mesothorax; 10. metathorax; 11. forewing; 12. hindwing; 13. mid-gut (stomach); 14. dorsal tube (heart); 15. ovary; 16. hind-gut (intestine, rectum & anus); 17. anus; 18. oviduct; 19. nerve cord (abdominal ganglia); 20. Malpighian tubes; 21. tarsal pads; 22. claws; 23. tarsus; 24. tibia; 25. femur; 26. trochanter; 27. fore-gut (crop, gizzard); 28. thoracic ganglion; 29. coxa; 30. salivary gland; 31. subesophageal ganglion; 32. mouthparts

Insect morphology is the study and description of the physical form of insects. The terminology used to describe insects is similar to that used for other arthropods due to their shared evolutionary history. Three physical features separate insects from other arthropods: they have a body divided into three regions (called tagmata) (head, thorax, and abdomen), three pairs of legs, and mouthparts located outside of the head capsule. This position of the mouthparts divides them from their closest relatives, the non-insect hexapods, which include Protura, Diplura, and Collembola.

There is enormous variation in body structure amongst insect species. Individuals can range from 0.3 mm (fairyflies) to 30 cm across (great owlet moth); have no eyes or many; well-developed wings or none; and legs modified for running, jumping, swimming, or even digging. These modifications allow insects to occupy almost every ecological niche except the deep ocean. This article describes the basic insect body and some variations of the different body parts; in the process, it defines many of the technical terms used to describe insect bodies.

== Anatomy summary ==
Insects, like all arthropods, have no interior skeleton; instead, they have an exoskeleton, a hard outer layer made mostly of chitin that protects and supports the body. The insect body is divided into three parts: the head, thorax, and abdomen. The head is specialized for sensory input and food intake; the thorax, which is the anchor point for the legs and wings (if present), is specialized for locomotion; and the abdomen is for digestion, respiration, excretion, and reproduction. Although the general function of the three body regions is the same across all insect species, there are major differences in basic structure, with wings, legs, antennae, and mouthparts being variable from group to group.

== External ==
=== Exoskeleton ===
The insect's outer skeleton, the cuticle, consists of two layers; the epicuticle, which is a thin, waxy, water-resistant outer layer that lacks chitin, and the layer under it is called the procuticle. This is chitinous and much thicker than the epicuticle and has two layers, the outer is the exocuticle while the inner is the endocuticle. The tough and flexible endocuticle is built from numerous layers of fibrous chitin and proteins, crisscrossing each other in a sandwich pattern, while the exocuticle is rigid and sclerotized. The exocuticle is greatly reduced in many soft-bodied insects, especially the larval stages (e.g., caterpillars). Chemically, chitin is a long-chain polymer of a N-acetylglucosamine, a derivative of glucose. In its unmodified form, chitin is translucent, pliable, and resilient. In arthropods, however, it is often modified, becoming embedded in a hardened proteinaceous matrix, which forms much of the exoskeleton. In its pure form, it is leathery, but when encrusted in calcium carbonate, it becomes much harder. The difference between the unmodified and modified forms is evident when comparing the body wall of a caterpillar (unmodified) to a beetle (modified).

From the embryonic stages, a layer of columnar or cuboidal epithelial cells gives rise to the external cuticle and an internal basement membrane. The majority of insect material is inside of the endocuticle. The cuticle provides muscular support and acts as a protective shield as the insect develops. However, since it cannot grow, the external sclerotized part of the cuticle is periodically shed in a process called "molting". As the time for molting approaches, most of the exocuticle material is reabsorbed. In molting, the old cuticle separates from the epidermis (apolysis). Enzymatic molting fluid is then released between the old cuticle and epidermis, which separates the exocuticle by digesting the endocuticle and sequestering its material for the new cuticle. When the new cuticle has formed sufficiently, the epicuticle and reduced exocuticle are shed in ecdysis.

The four principal regions of an insect body segment are the tergum or dorsal, sternum or ventral, and the two pleura or laterals. Hardened plates in the exoskeleton are called sclerites, which are subdivisions of the major regions – tergites, sternites, and pleurites, for respective regions tergum, sternum, and pleuron.

=== Head ===

The head in most insects is enclosed in a hard, heavily sclerotized, exoskeletal head capsule. This bears most of the sensory organs, including the antennae, ocelli, and compound eyes, along with the mouthparts. It consists of six segments that bear the paired head appendages, including the mouthparts, each pair on a specific segment.

=== Thorax ===
The insect thorax has three segments: the prothorax, mesothorax, and metathorax. The anterior segment, closest to the head, is the prothorax; its major features are the first pair of legs and the pronotum. The middle segment is the mesothorax; its major features are the second pair of legs and the anterior wings, if any. The third, the posterior, thoracic segment, abutting the abdomen, is the metathorax, which bears the third pair of legs and the posterior wings. Each segment is delineated by an intersegmental suture. Each segment has four basic regions. The dorsal surface is called the tergum (or notum, to distinguish it from the abdominal terga). The two lateral regions are called the pleura (singular: pleuron), and the ventral aspect is called the sternum. In turn, the notum of the prothorax is called the pronotum, the notum for the mesothorax is called the mesonotum and the notum for the metathorax is called the metanotum. Continuing with this logic, there are also the mesopleura and metapleura, as well as the mesosternum and metasternum.

The tergal plates of the thorax are simple structures in apterygotes and many immature insects but are variously modified in winged adults. The pterothoracic nota each have two main divisions: the anterior, wing-bearing alinotum and the posterior, phragma-bearing postnotum. Phragmata (singular: phragma) are plate-like apodemes that extend inwards below the antecostal sutures, marking the primary intersegmental folds between segments; phragmata provide attachment for the longitudinal flight muscles. Each alinotum (sometimes confusingly referred to as a "notum") may be traversed by sutures that mark the position of internal strengthening ridges and commonly divide the plate into three areas: the anterior prescutum, the scutum, and the smaller posterior scutellum. The lateral pleural sclerites are believed to be derived from the subcoxal segment of the ancestral insect leg. These sclerites may be separate, as in silverfish, or fused into an almost continuous sclerotic area, as in most winged insects.

==== Prothorax ====
The pronotum of the prothorax may be simple in structure and small in comparison with the other nota, but in beetles, mantids, many bugs, and some Orthoptera, the pronotum is expanded, and in cockroaches, it forms a shield that covers part of the head and mesothorax.

==== Pterothorax ====
Because the mesothorax and metathorax hold the wings, they have a combined name called the pterothorax (pteron=wing). The forewing, which goes by different names in different orders (e.g., the tegmina in Orthoptera and elytra in Coleoptera), arises between the mesonotum and the mesopleuron, and the hindwing articulates between the metanotum and metapleuron. The legs arise from the mesopleuron and metapleura. The mesothorax and metathorax each have a pleural suture (mesopleural and metapleural sutures) that runs from the wing base to the coxa of the leg. The sclerite anterior to the pleural suture is called the episternum (serially, the mesepisternum and metepisternum). The sclerite posterior to the suture is called the epimiron (serially, the mesepimiron and metepimiron). Spiracles, the external organs of the respiratory system, are found on the pterothorax, usually one between the pro- and mesopleoron, as well as one between the meso- and metapleuron.

The ventral view or sternum follows the same convention, with the prosternum under the prothorax, the mesosternum under the mesothorax and the metasternum under the metathorax. The notum, pleura, and sternum of each segment have a variety of different sclerites and sutures, varying greatly from order to order, and they will not be discussed in detail in this section.

==== Wings ====
Cross-section of wing vein

Most phylogenetically advanced insects have two pairs of wings located on the second and third thoracic segments. Insects are the only invertebrates to have developed flight capability, and this has played an important part in their success. Insect flight is not very well understood, relying on turbulent aerodynamic effects. The primitive insect groups use muscles that act directly on the wing structure. The more advanced groups making up the Neoptera have foldable wings, and their muscles act on the thorax wall and power the wings indirectly. These muscles can contract multiple times for each single nerve impulse, allowing the wings to beat faster than would ordinarily be possible.

Insect flight can be rapid, maneuverable, and versatile, possibly due to the changing shape, extraordinary control, and variable motion of the insect wing. Insect orders use different flight mechanisms; for example, the flight of a butterfly can be explained using steady-state, nontransitory aerodynamics, and thin airfoil theory.

===== Joints =====

The various movements of the wings, especially in insects that flex their wings horizontally over their backs when at rest, demand a more complicated articular structure at the wing base than a mere hinge of the wing with the body. Each wing is attached to the body by a membranous basal area, but the articular membrane contain several small articular sclerites, collectively known as the pteralia. The pteralia include an anterior humeral plate at the base of the costal vein, a group of axillaries (Ax) associated with the subcostal, radial, and vannal veins, and two less definite median plates (m, m') at the base of the mediocubital area. The axillaries are specifically developed only in wing-flexing insects, where they constitute the flexor mechanism of the wing operated by the flexor muscle arising on the pleuron. Characteristic of the wing base is also a small lobe on the anterior margin of the articular area proximal to the humeral plate, which, in the forewing of some insects, is developed into a large, flat, scale-like flap, the tegula, overlapping the base of the wing. Posteriorly, the articular membrane often forms an ample lobe between the wing and the body, and its margin is generally thickened and corrugated, giving the appearance of a ligament, the so-called axillary cord, continuous mesally with the posterior marginal scutellar fold of the tergal plate bearing the wing.

The articular sclerites, or pteralia, of the wing base of the wing-flexing insects and their relations to the body and the wing veins, shown diagrammatically, are as follows:

- Humeral plates
- First Axillary
- Second Axillary
- Third Axillary
- Fourth Axillary
- Median plates (m, m')

The humeral plate is usually a small sclerite on the anterior margin of the wing base, movable and articulated with the base of the costal vein. Odonata have their humeral plates greatly enlarged, with two muscles arising from the episternum inserted into the humeral plates and two from the edge of the epimeron inserted into the axillary plate.

The first axillary sclerite (lAx) is the anterior hinge plate of the wing base. Its anterior part is supported on the anterior notal wing process of the tergum (ANP); its posterior part articulates with the tergal margin. The anterior end of the sclerite is generally produced as a slender arm, the apex of which (e) is always associated with the base of the subcostal vein (Sc), though it is not united with the latter. The body of the sclerite articulates laterally with the second axillary. The second axillary sclerite (2Ax) is more variable in form than the first axillary, but its mechanical relations are no less definite. It is obliquely hinged to the outer margin of the body of the first axillary, and the radial vein (R) is always flexibly attached to its anterior end (d). The second axillary presents both a dorsal and ventral sclerotization in the wing base; its ventral surface rests upon the fulcral wing process of the pleuron. The second axillary, therefore, is the pivotal sclerite of the wing base, and it specifically manipulates the radial vein.

The third axillary sclerite (3Ax) lies in the posterior part of the articular region of the wing. Its form is highly variable and often irregular, but the third axillary is the sclerite on which is inserted the flexor muscle of the wing (D). Mesally, it articulates anteriorly (f) with the posterior end of the second axillary, and posteriorly (b) with the posterior wing process of the tergum (PNP), or with a small fourth axillary when the latter is present. Distally, the third axillary is prolonged in a process always associated with the bases of the group of veins in the anal region of the wing, here termed the vannal veins (V). The third axillary, therefore, is usually the posterior hinge plate of the wing base and is the active sclerite of the flexor mechanism, which directly manipulates the vannal veins. The contraction of the flexor muscle (D) revolves the third axillary on its mesal articulations (b, f), and thereby lifts its distal arm; this movement produces the flexion of the wing. The fourth axillary sclerite is not a constant element of the wing base. When present, it is usually a small plate intervening between the third axillary and the posterior notal wing process and is probably a detached piece of the latter.

The median plates (m, m') are also sclerites that are not so definitely differentiated as specific plates as are the three principal axillaries, but they are important elements of the flexor apparatus. They lie in the median area of the wing base distal to the second and third axillaries and are separated from each other by an oblique line (bf), which forms a prominent convex fold during flexion of the wing. The proximal plate (m) is usually attached to the distal arm of the third axillary and perhaps should be regarded as a part of the latter. The distal plate (m') is less constantly present as a distinct sclerite and may be represented by a general sclerotization of the base of the mediocubital field of the wing. When the veins of this region are distinct at their bases, they are associated with the outer median plate.

===== Coupling, folding, and other features =====
In many insect species, the forewing and hindwing are coupled together, which improves the aerodynamic efficiency of flight. The most common coupling mechanism (e.g., Hymenoptera and Trichoptera) is a row of small hooks on the forward margin of the hindwing, or "hamuli", which lock onto the forewing, keeping them held together (hamulate coupling). In some other insect species (e.g., Mecoptera, Lepidoptera, and some Trichoptera) the jugal lobe of the forewing covers a portion of the hindwing (jugal coupling), or the margins of the forewing and hindwing overlap broadly (amplexiform coupling), or the hindwing bristles, or frenulum, hook under the retaining structure or retinalucum on the forewing.

When at rest, the wings are held over the back in most insects, which may involve longitudinal folding of the wing membrane and sometimes also transverse folding. Folding may sometimes occur along the flexion lines. Though fold lines may be transverse, as in the hindwings of beetles and earwigs, they are normally radial to the base of the wing, allowing adjacent sections of a wing to be folded over or under each other. The commonest fold line is the jugal fold, situated just behind the third anal vein, although, most Neoptera have a jugal fold just behind vein 3A on the forewings. It is sometimes also present on the hindwings. Where the anal area of the hindwing is large, as in Orthoptera and Blattodea, the whole of this part may be folded under the anterior part of the wing along a vannal fold a little posterior to the claval furrow. In addition, in Orthoptera and Blattodea, the anal area is folded like a fan along the veins, the anal veins being convex, at the crests of the folds, and the accessory veins concave. Whereas the claval furrow and jugal fold are probably homologous in different species, the vannal fold varies in position in different taxa. Folding is produced by a muscle arising on the pleuron and inserted into the third axillary sclerite in such a way that when it contracts, the sclerite pivots about its points of articulation with the posterior notal process and the second axillary sclerite.

As a result, the distal arm of the third axillary sclerite rotates upwards and inwards, so that finally its position is completely reversed. The anal veins are articulated with this sclerite in such a way that when it moves they are carried with it and become flexed over the back of the insect. Activity of the same muscle in flight affects the power output of the wing and so it is also important in flight control. In orthopteroid insects, the elasticity of the cuticle causes the vannal area of the wing to fold along the veins. Consequently, energy is expended in unfolding this region when the wings are moved to the flight position. In general, wing extension probably results from the contraction of muscles attached to the basilar sclerite or, in some insects, to the subalar sclerite.

==== Legs ====
Diagram of a typical insect leg

The typical and usual segments of the insect leg are divided into the coxa, one trochanter, the femur, the tibia, the tarsus, and the pretarsus. The coxa in its more symmetrical form, has the shape of a short cylinder or truncate cone, though commonly it is ovate and may be almost spherical. The proximal end of the coxa is girdled by a submarginal basicostal suture that forms internally a ridge, or basicosta, and sets off a marginal flange, the coxomarginale, or basicoxite. The basicosta strengthens the base of the coxa and is commonly enlarged on the outer wall to give insertion to muscles; on the mesal half of the coxa, however, it is usually weak and often confluent with the coxal margin. The trochanteral muscles that take their origin in the coxa are always attached distally to the basicosta. The coxa is attached to the body by an articular membrane, the coxal corium, which surrounds its base. These two articulations are perhaps the primary dorsal and ventral articular points of the subcoxo-coxal hinge. In addition, the insect coxa has often an anterior articulation with the anterior, ventral end of the trochantin, but the trochantinal articulation does not coexist with a sternal articulation. The pleural articular surface of the coxa is borne on a mesal inflection of the coxal wall. If the coxa is movable on the pleural articulation alone, the coxal articular surface is usually inflected to a sufficient depth to give leverage to the abductor muscles inserted on the outer rim of the coxal base. Distally the coxa bears an anterior and a posterior articulation with the trochanter. The outer wall of the coxa is often marked by a suture extending from the base to the anterior trochanteral articulation. In some insects, the coxal suture falls in line with the pleural suture. In such cases, the coxa appears to be divided into two parts corresponding to the episternum and epimeron of the pleuron. The coxal suture is absent in many insects.

The inflection of the coxal wall bearing the pleural articular surface divides the lateral wall of the basicoxite into a prearticular part and a postarticular part, and the two areas often appear as two marginal lobes on the base of the coxa. The posterior lobe is usually the larger and is termed the meron. The meron may be greatly enlarged by an extension distally in the posterior wall of the coxa; in the Neuroptera, Mecoptera, Trichoptera, and Lepidoptera, the meron is so large that the coxa appears to be divided into an anterior piece, the so-called "coxa genuina," and the meron, but the meron never includes the region of the posterior trochanteral articulation, and the groove delimiting it is always a part of the basicostal suture. A coxa with an enlarged meron has an appearance similar to one divided by a coxal suture falling in line with the pleural suture, but the two conditions are fundamentally quite different and should not be confused. The meron reaches the extreme of its departure from the usual condition in the Diptera. In some of the more generalized flies, as in the Tipulidae, the meron of the middle leg appears as a large lobe of the coxa projecting upward and posteriorly from the coxal base; in higher members of the order, it becomes completely separated from the coxa and forms a plate of the lateral wall of the mesothorax.

The trochanter is the basal segment of the telopodite; it is always a small segment in the insect leg, freely movable by a horizontal hinge on the coxa, but more or less fixed to the base of the femur. When movable on the femur the trochantero femoral hinge is usually vertical or oblique in a vertical plane, giving a slight movement of production and reduction at the joint, though only a reductor muscle is present. In the Odonata, both nymphs and adults, there are two trochanteral segments, but they are not movable on each other; the second contains the reductor muscle of the femur. The usual single trochanteral segment of insects, therefore, probably represents the two trochanters of other arthropods fused into one apparent segment since it is not likely that the primary coxotrochanteral hinge has been lost from the leg. In some of the Hymenoptera, a basal subdivision of the femur simulates a second trochanter, but the insertion of the reductor muscle on its base attests that it belongs to the femoral segment, since as shown in the odonate leg, the reductor has its origin in the true second trochanter.

The femur is the third segment of the insect leg, is usually the longest and strongest part of the limb, but it varies in size from the huge hind femur of leaping Orthoptera to a very small segment such as is present in many larval forms. The volume of the femur is generally correlated with the size of the tibial muscles contained within it, but it is sometimes enlarged and modified in shape for other purposes than that of accommodating the tibial muscles. The tibia is characteristically a slender segment in adult insects, only a little shorter than the femur or the combined femur and trochanter. Its proximal end forms a more or less distinct head bent toward the femur, a device allowing the tibia to be flexed close against the undersurface of the femur.

The terms profemur, mesofemur, and metafemur refer to the femora of the front, middle and hind legs of an insect, respectively. Similarly, protibia, mesotibia, and metatibia refer to the tibiae of the front, middle and hind legs.

The tarsus of insects corresponds to the penultimate segment of a generalized arthropod limb, which is the segment called the propodite in Crustacea. In adult insects, it is commonly subdivided into two to five subsegments, or tarsomeres, but in the Protura, some Collembola, and most holometabolous insect larvae it preserves the primitive form of a simple segment. The subsegments of the adult insect tarsus are usually freely movable on one another by inflected connecting membranes, but the tarsus never has intrinsic muscles. The tarsus of adult pterygote insects having fewer than five subsegments is probably specialized by the loss of one or more subsegments or by a fusion of adjoining subsegments. In the tarsi of Acrididae, the long basal piece is composed of three united tarsomeres, leaving the fourth and the fifth. The basal tarsomere is sometimes conspicuously enlarged and is distinguished as the basitarsus. On the under surfaces of the tarsal subsegments in certain Orthoptera, there are small pads, the tarsal pulvilli, or euplantulae. The tarsus is occasionally fused with the tibia in larval insects, forming a tibiotarsal segment; in some cases, it appears to be eliminated or reduced to a rudiment between the tibia and the pretarsus.

For the most part, the femur and tibia are the longest leg segments but variations in the lengths and robustness of each segment relate to their functions. For example, gressorial and cursorial, or walking and running type insects respectively, usually have well-developed femora and tibiae on all legs, whereas jumping (saltatorial) insects such as grasshoppers have disproportionately developed metafemora and metatibiae. In aquatic beetles (Coleoptera) and bugs (Hemiptera), the tibiae and/or tarsi of one or more pairs of legs usually are modified for swimming (natatorial) with fringes of long, slender hairs. Many ground-dwelling insects, such as mole crickets (Orthoptera: Gryllotalpidae), nymphal cicadas (Hemiptera: Cicadidae), and scarab beetles (Scarabaeidae), have the tibiae of the forelegs (protibiae) enlarged and modified for digging (fossorial), whereas the forelegs of some predatory insects, such as mantispid lacewings (Neuroptera) and mantids (Mantodea), are specialized for seizing prey, or raptorial. The tibia and basal tarsomere of each hindleg of honey bees are modified for the collection and carriage of pollen.

=== Abdomen ===
The ground plan of the abdomen of an adult insect typically consists of 11–12 segments and is less strongly sclerotized than the head or thorax. Each segment of the abdomen is represented by a sclerotized tergum, sternum, and perhaps a pleurite. Terga are separated from each other and from the adjacent sterna or pleura by a membrane. Spiracles are located in the pleural area. Variation of this ground plan includes the fusion of terga or terga and sterna to form continuous dorsal or ventral shields or a conical tube. Some insects bear a sclerite in the pleural area called a laterotergite. Ventral sclerites are sometimes called laterosternites. During the embryonic stage of many insects and the postembryonic stage of primitive insects, 11 abdominal segments are present. In modern insects there is a tendency toward reduction in the number of the abdominal segments, but the primitive number of 11 is maintained during embryogenesis. Variation in abdominal segment number is considerable. If the Apterygota are considered to be indicative of the ground plan for pterygotes, confusion reigns: adult Protura have 12 segments, Collembola have 6. The orthopteran family Acrididae has 11 segments, and a fossil specimen of Zoraptera has a 10-segmented abdomen.

Generally, the first seven abdominal segments of adults (the pregenital segments) are similar in structure and lack appendages. However, apterygotes (bristletails and silverfish) and many immature aquatic insects have abdominal appendages. Apterygotes possess a pair of styles; rudimentary appendages that are serially homologous with the distal part of the thoracic legs. And, mesally, one or two pairs of protrusible (or exsertile) vesicles on at least some abdominal segments. These vesicles are derived from the coxal and trochanteral endites (inner annulated lobes) of the ancestral abdominal appendages. Aquatic larvae and nymphs may have gills laterally on some to most abdominal segments. Of the rest of the abdominal segments consist of the reproductive and anal parts.

==== External genitalia ====
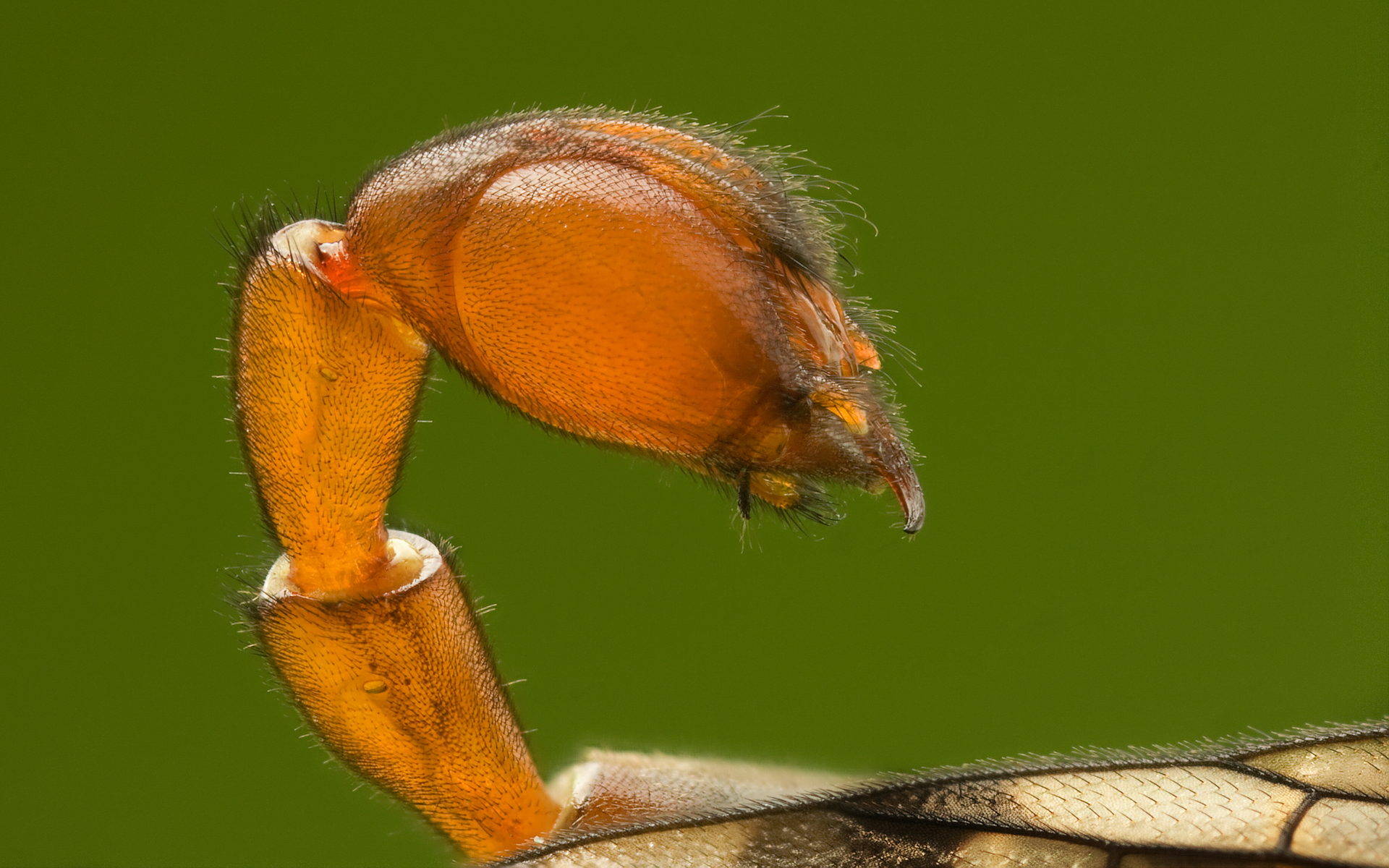
The abdominal terminus of male scorpionflies is enlarged into a "genital bulb", as seen in Panorpa communis

The organs concerned specifically with mating and the deposition of eggs are known collectively as the external genitalia, although they may be largely internal. The components of the external genitalia of insects are very diverse in form and often have considerable taxonomic value, particularly among species that appear structurally similar in other respects. The male external genitalia have been used widely to aid in distinguishing species, whereas the female external genitalia may be simpler and less varied.

The terminalia of adult female insects include internal structures for receiving the male copulatory organ and his spermatozoa and external structures used for oviposition (egg-laying; section 5.8). Segments 8 and 9 bear the genitalia; segment 10 is visible as a complete segment in many "lower" insects but always lacks appendages. Most female insects have an egg-laying tube, or ovipositor; it is absent in termites, parasitic lice, many Plecoptera, and most Ephemeroptera. Ovipositors take two forms:

- The anal-genital part of the abdomen. which consists generally of segments 8 or 9 to the abdominal apex
- substitutional, composed of extensible posterior abdominal segments.

==== Other appendages ====
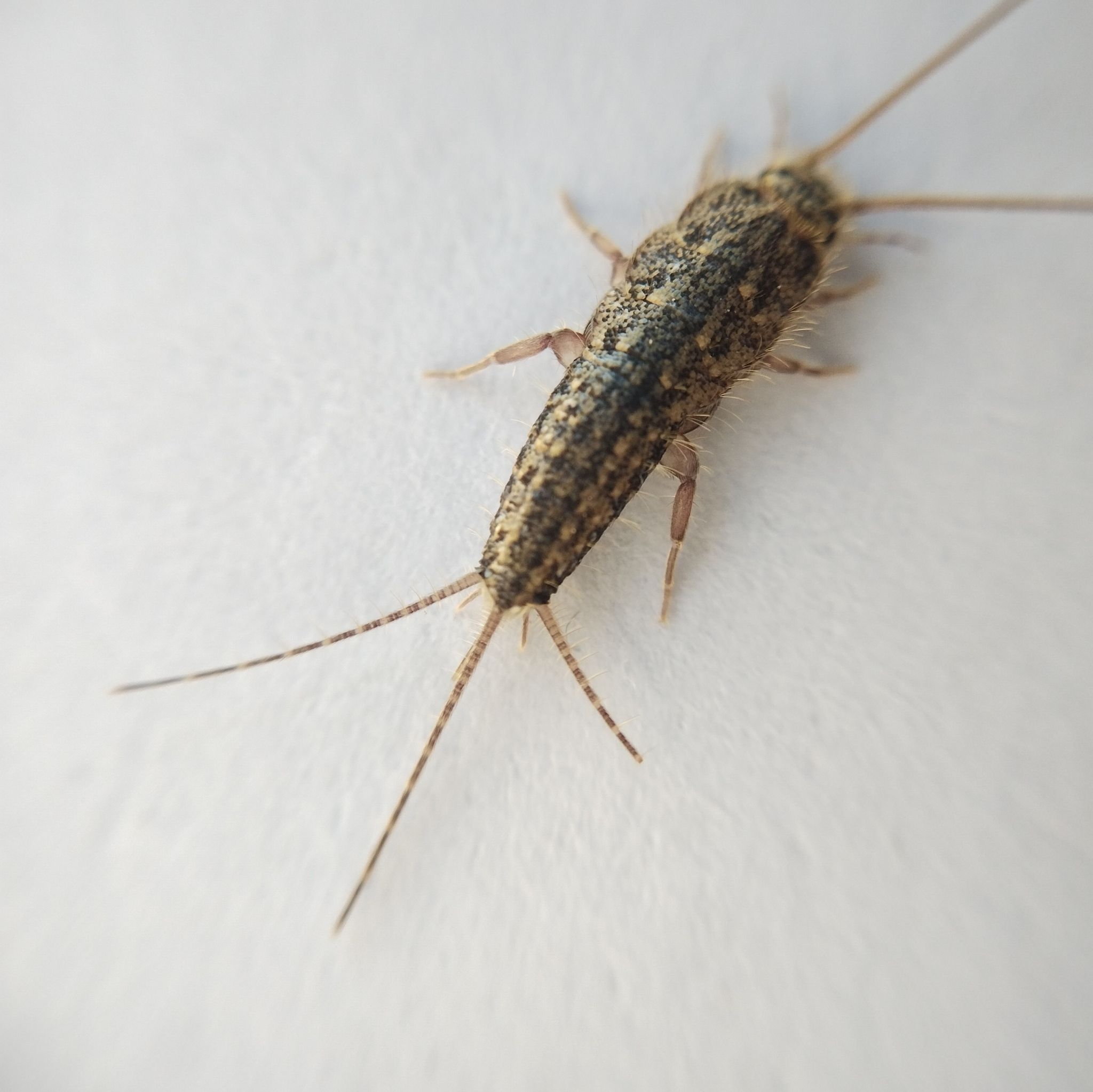
Ctenopisma lineatum showing the two cerci and the central caudal filament.

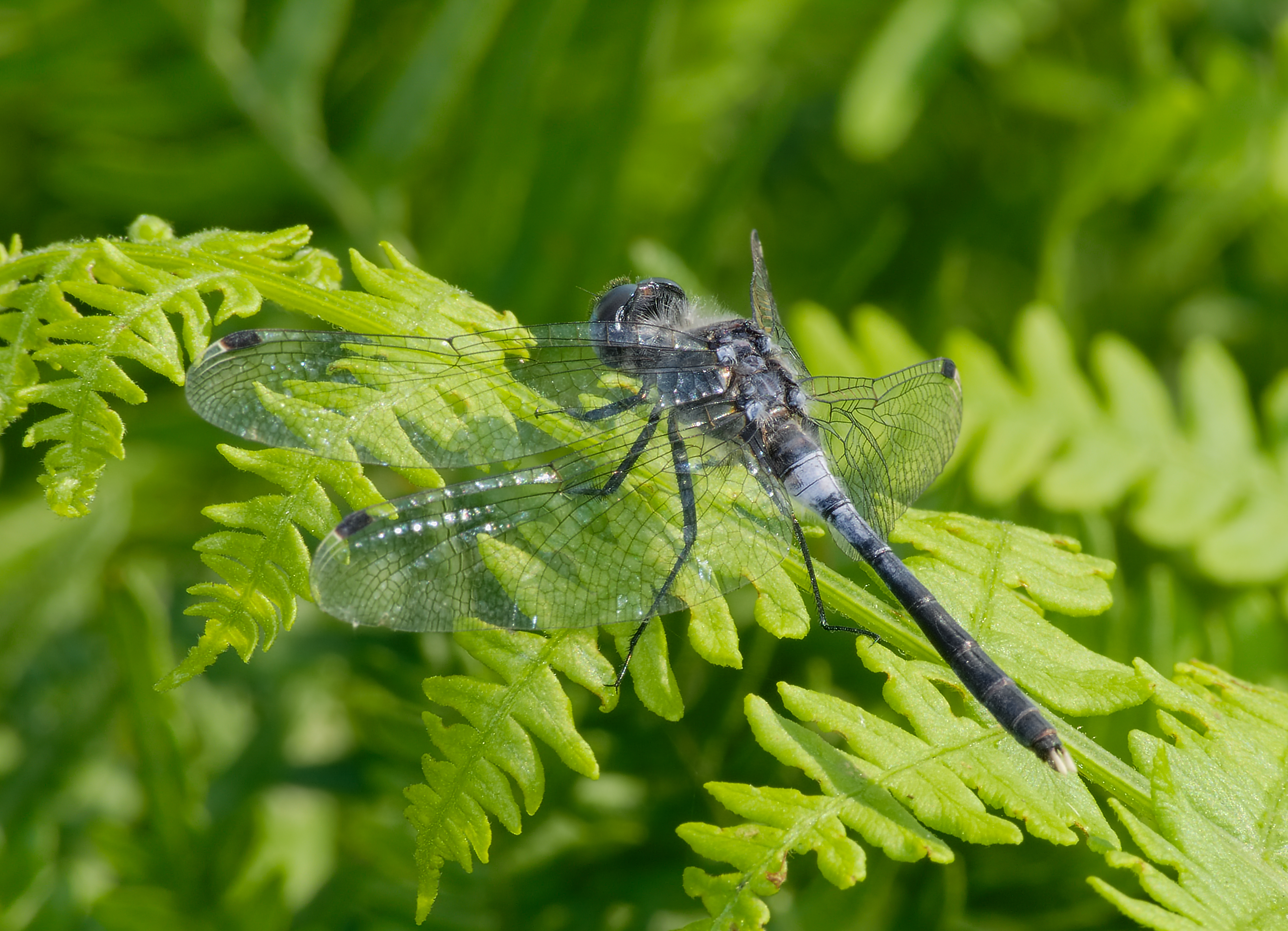
Showing the paired white paraprocts at the posterior tip.

The terminal abdominal segments have excretory and sensory functions in all insects, besides the reproductive function in adults. The small segment 11 may be represented by an epiproct (usually a dorsal plate or filament above the anus of certain insects); other appendages include:

- the paraprocts: paired plate-like appendages also derived from the sternum at the side of the tip of the abdomen, often most apparent in certain basal orders such as Odonata;
- the cerci: a pair of appendages which articulate laterally on segment 11; typically, these are annulated and filamentous but have been modified (e.g. the forceps of earwigs) or reduced in different insect orders.
- a central caudal filament, prolongation or median appendix dorsalis, which arises from the tip of the epiproct in certain apterygotes, many mayflies (Ephemeroptera), and a few fossil insects. A similar structure in nymphal stoneflies (Plecoptera) is of uncertain homology.

== Internal ==
=== Nervous system ===
The nervous system of an insect can be divided into a brain and a ventral nerve cord. The head capsule is made up of six fused segments, each with a pair of ganglia, or a cluster of nerve cells outside of the brain. The first three pairs of ganglia are fused into the brain, while the three following pairs are fused into a structure of three pairs of ganglia under the insect's esophagus, called the subesophageal ganglion.

The thoracic segments have one ganglion on each side, which are connected into a pair, one pair per segment. This arrangement is also seen in the abdomen but only in the first eight segments. Many species of insects have reduced numbers of ganglia due to fusion or reduction. Some cockroaches have just six ganglia in the abdomen, whereas the wasp Vespa crabro has only two in the thorax and three in the abdomen. Some insects, like the house fly Musca domestica, have all the body ganglia fused into a single large thoracic ganglion.

At least a few insects have nociceptors, cells that detect and transmit sensations of pain. This was discovered in 2003 by studying the variation in reactions of larvae of the common fruitfly Drosophila to the touch of a heated probe and an unheated one. The larvae reacted to the touch of the heated probe with a stereotypical rolling behavior that was not exhibited when the larvae were touched by the unheated probe. Although nociception has been demonstrated in insects, there is not a consensus that insects feel pain consciously.

=== Digestive system ===
An insect uses its digestive system for all steps in food processing: digestion, absorption, and feces delivery and elimination. Most of this food is ingested in the form of macromolecules and other complex substances like proteins, polysaccharides, fats, and nucleic acids. These macromolecules must be broken down by catabolic reactions into smaller molecules like amino acids and simple sugars before being used by cells of the body for energy, growth, or reproduction. This break-down process is known as digestion. The main structure of an insect's digestive system is a long-enclosed tube called the alimentary canal (or gut), which runs lengthwise through the body. The alimentary canal directs food in one direction: from the mouth to the anus. The gut is where almost all of insects' digestion takes place. It can be divided into three sections – the foregut, midgut and hindgut – each of which performs a different process of digestion. In addition to the alimentary canal, insects also have paired salivary glands and salivary reservoirs. These structures usually reside in the thorax, adjacent to the foregut.

==== Foregut ====
Stylized diagram of insect digestive tract showing malpighian tubule, from an insect of the order Orthoptera.

The first section of the alimentary canal is the foregut (element 27 in numbered diagram), or stomodaeum. The foregut is lined with a cuticular lining made of chitin and proteins as protection from tough food. The foregut includes the buccal cavity (mouth), pharynx, esophagus, and Crop and proventriculus (any part may be highly modified), which both store food and signify when to continue passing onward to the midgut. Here, digestion starts as partially chewed food is broken down by saliva from the salivary glands. As the salivary glands produce fluid and carbohydrate-digesting enzymes (mostly amylases), strong muscles in the pharynx pump fluid into the buccal cavity, lubricating the food like the salivarium does, and helping blood feeders, and xylem and phloem feeders.

From there, the pharynx passes food to the esophagus, which could be just a simple tube passing it on to the crop and proventriculus, and then on ward to the midgut, as in most insects. Alternately, the foregut may expand into a very enlarged crop and proventriculus, or the crop could just be a diverticulum, or fluid filled structure, as in some Diptera species.

Bumblebee defecating. Note the contraction of the anus, which provides internal pressure.

The salivary glands (element 30 in numbered diagram) in an insect's mouth produce saliva. The salivary ducts lead from the glands to the reservoirs and then forward through the head to an opening called the salivarium, located behind the hypopharynx. By moving its mouthparts (element 32 in numbered diagram) the insect can mix its food with saliva. The mixture of saliva and food then travels through the salivary tubes into the mouth, where it begins to break down. Some insects, like flies, have extra-oral digestion. Insects using extra-oral digestion expel digestive enzymes onto their food to break it down. This strategy allows insects to extract a significant proportion of the available nutrients from the food source.

==== Midgut ====
Once food leaves the crop, it passes to the midgut (element 13 in numbered diagram), also known as the mesenteron, where the majority of digestion takes place. Microscopic projections from the midgut wall, called microvilli, increase the surface area of the wall and allow more nutrients to be absorbed; they tend to be close to the origin of the midgut. In some insects, the role of the microvilli and where they are located may vary. For example, specialized microvilli producing digestive enzymes may more likely be near the end of the midgut, and absorption near the origin or beginning of the midgut.

In the wingless (apterygote) orders Archaeognatha and Zygentoma (and the hexapods Entognatha), the midgut epithelium is derived entirely from yolk cells. In the majority of the flying insects (Neoptera), it is derived from bipolar formation. The Palaeoptera (mayflies and dragonflies) show a transition between apterygotes and neopterans, where the middle part of the midgut epithelium is derived from yolk cells and the anterior and posterior parts are formed through bipolar formation.

==== Hindgut ====
In the hindgut (element 16 in numbered diagram), or proctodaeum, undigested food particles are joined by uric acid to form fecal pellets. The rectum absorbs 90% of the water in these fecal pellets, and the dry pellet is then eliminated through the anus (element 17), completing the process of digestion. The uric acid is formed using hemolymph waste products diffused from the Malpighian tubules (element 20). It is then emptied directly into the alimentary canal, at the junction between the midgut and hindgut. The number of Malpighian tubules possessed by a given insect varies between species, ranging from only two tubules in some insects to over 100 tubules in others.

=== Respiratory systems ===
Insect respiration is accomplished without lungs. Instead, the insect respiratory system uses a system of internal tubes and sacs through which gases either diffuse or are actively pumped, delivering oxygen directly to tissues that need it via their trachea (element 8 in numbered diagram). Since oxygen is delivered directly, the circulatory system is not used to carry oxygen, and is therefore greatly reduced. The insect circulatory system has no veins or arteries, and instead consists of little more than a single, perforated dorsal tube that pulses peristaltically. Toward the thorax, the dorsal tube (element 14) divides into chambers and acts like the insect's heart. The opposite end of the dorsal tube is like the aorta of the insect circulating the hemolymph, arthropods' fluid analog of blood, inside the body cavity. Air is taken in through openings on the sides of the abdomen called spiracles.

There are many different patterns of gas exchange demonstrated by different groups of insects. Gas exchange patterns in insects can range from continuous and diffusive ventilation, to discontinuous gas exchange. During continuous gas exchange, oxygen is taken in and carbon dioxide is released in a continuous cycle. In discontinuous gas exchange, however, the insect takes in oxygen while it is active and small amounts of carbon dioxide are released when the insect is at rest. Diffusive ventilation is simply a form of continuous gas exchange that occurs by diffusion rather than physically taking in the oxygen. Some species of insect that are submerged also have adaptations to aid in respiration. As larvae, many insects have gills that can extract oxygen dissolved in water, while others need to rise to the water surface to replenish air supplies, which may be held or trapped in special structures.

=== Circulatory system ===
Insect blood or haemolymph's main function is that of transport and it bathes the insect's body organs. Making up usually less than 25% of an insect's body weight, it transports hormones, nutrients and wastes and has a role in, osmoregulation, temperature control, immunity, storage (water, carbohydrates and fats) and skeletal function. It also plays an essential part in the moulting process. An additional role of the haemolymph in some orders, can be that of predatory defence. It can contain unpalatable and malodourous chemicals that will act as a deterrent to predators. Haemolymph contains molecules, ions and cells; regulating chemical exchanges between tissues, haemolymph is encased in the insect body cavity or haemocoel. It is transported around the body by combined heart (posterior) and aorta (anterior) pulsations, which are located dorsally just under the surface of the body. It differs from vertebrate blood in that it does not contain any red blood cells and therefore is without high oxygen carrying capacity, and is more similar to lymph found in vertebrates.

Body fluids enter through one-way valved ostia, which are openings situated along the length of the combined aorta and heart organ. Pumping of the haemolymph occurs by waves of peristaltic contraction, originating at the body's posterior end, pumping forwards into the dorsal vessel, out via the aorta and then into the head where it flows out into the haemocoel. The haemolymph is circulated to the appendages unidirectionally with the aid of muscular pumps or accessory pulsatile organs usually found at the base of the antennae or wings and sometimes in the legs, with pumping rates accelerating with periods of increased activity. Movement of haemolymph is particularly important for thermoregulation in orders such as Odonata, Lepidoptera, Hymenoptera and Diptera.

=== Endocrine system ===
These glands are part of the endocrine system:

1. Neurosecretory cells

2. Corpora cardiaca

3. Prothoracic glands

4. Corpora allata

=== Reproductive system ===
==== Female ====
Female insects are able to make eggs, receive and store sperm, manipulate sperm from different males, and lay eggs. Their reproductive systems are made up of a pair of ovaries, accessory glands, one or more spermathecae, and ducts connecting these parts. The ovaries make eggs and accessory glands produce the substances to help package and lay the eggs. Spermathecae store sperm for varying periods of time and, along with portions of the oviducts, can control sperm use. The ducts and spermathecae are lined with a cuticle.

The ovaries are made up of a number of egg tubes, called ovarioles, which vary in size and number by species. The number of eggs that the insect is able to make vary by the number of ovarioles with the rate that eggs can be developed being also influenced by ovariole design. In meroistic ovaries, the eggs-to-be divide repeatedly and most of the daughter cells become helper cells for a single oocyte in the cluster. In panoistic ovaries, each egg-to-be produced by stem germ cells develops into an oocyte; there are no helper cells from the germ line. Production of eggs by panoistic ovaries tends to be slower than that by meroistic ovaries.

Accessory glands or glandular parts of the oviducts produce a variety of substances for sperm maintenance, transport, and fertilization, as well as for protection of eggs. They can produce glue and protective substances for coating eggs or tough coverings for a batch of eggs called oothecae. Spermathecae are tubes or sacs in which sperm can be stored between the time of mating and the time an egg is fertilized. Paternity testing of insects has revealed that some, and probably many, female insects use the spermatheca and various ducts to control or bias sperm used in favor of some males over others.

==== Male ====
The main component of the male reproductive system is the testis, suspended in the body cavity by tracheae and the fat body. The more primitive apterygote insects have a single testis, and in some lepidopterans the two maturing testes are secondarily fused into one structure during the later stages of larval development, although the ducts leading from them remain separate. However, most male insects have a pair of testes, inside of which are sperm tubes or follicles that are enclosed within a membranous sac. The follicles connect to the vas deferens by the vas efferens, and the two tubular vasa deferentia connect to a median ejaculatory duct that leads to the outside. A portion of the vas deferens is often enlarged to form the seminal vesicle, which stores the sperm before they are discharged into the female. The seminal vesicles have glandular linings that secrete nutrients for nourishment and maintenance of the sperm. The ejaculatory duct is derived from an invagination of the epidermal cells during development and, as a result, has a cuticular lining. The terminal portion of the ejaculatory duct may be sclerotized to form the intromittent organ, the aedeagus. The remainder of the male reproductive system is derived from embryonic mesoderm, except for the germ cells, or spermatogonia, which descend from the primordial pole cells very early during embryogenesis. The aedeagus can be quite pronounced or de minimis. The base of the aedeagus may be the partially sclerotized phallotheca, also called the phallosoma or theca. In some species the phallotheca contains a space, called the endosoma (internal holding pouch), into which the tip end of the aedeagus may be withdrawn (retracted). The vas deferens is sometimes drawn into (folded into) the phallotheca together with a seminal vesicle.

== Internal morphology of different taxa ==
=== Blattodea ===
Cockroaches are most common in tropical and subtropical climates. Some species are in close association with human dwellings and widely found around garbage or in the kitchen. Cockroaches are generally omnivorous with the exception of the wood-eating species such as Cryptocercus; these roaches are incapable of digesting cellulose themselves but have symbiotic relationships with various protozoans and bacteria that digest the cellulose, allowing them to extract the nutrients. The similarity of these symbionts in the genus Cryptocercus to those in termites are such that it has been suggested that they are more closely related to termites than to other cockroaches, and current research strongly supports this hypothesis of relationships. All species studied so far carry the obligate mutualistic endosymbiont bacterium Blattabacterium, with the exception of Nocticola australiensis, an Australian cave dwelling species without eyes, pigment or wings, and which recent genetic studies indicates are very primitive cockroaches.

Cockroaches, like all insects, breathe through a system of tubes called tracheae. The tracheae of insects are attached to the spiracles, excluding the head. Thus cockroaches, like all insects, are not dependent on the mouth and windpipe to breathe. The valves open when the CO_{2} level in the insect rises to a high level; then the CO_{2} diffuses out of the tracheae to the outside and fresh O_{2} diffuses in. Unlike in vertebrates that depend on blood for transporting O_{2} and CO_{2}, the tracheal system brings the air directly to cells, the tracheal tubes branching continually like a tree until their finest divisions, tracheoles, are associated with each cell, allowing gaseous oxygen to dissolve in the cytoplasm lying across the fine cuticle lining of the tracheole. CO_{2} diffuses out of the cell into the tracheole. While cockroaches do not have lungs and thus do not actively breathe in the vertebrate lung manner, in some very large species the body musculature may contract rhythmically to forcibly move air out and in the spiracles; this may be considered a form of breathing.

=== Coleoptera ===
The digestive system of beetles is primarily based on plants, which they for the most part feed upon, with mostly the anterior midgut performing digestion. However, in predatory species (e.g., Carabidae) most digestion occurs in the crop by means of midgut enzymes. In Elateridae species, the predatory larvae defecate enzymes on their prey, with digestion being extraorally. The alimentary canal basically comprises a short narrow pharynx, a widened expansion, the crop and a poorly developed gizzard. After there is a midgut, that varies in dimensions between species, with a large amount of cecum, with a hingut, with varying lengths. There are typically four to six Malpighian tubules.

The nervous system in beetles contains all the types found in insects, varying between different species. With three thoracic and seven or eight abdominal ganglia can be distinguished to that in which all the thoracic and abdominal ganglia are fused to form a composite structure. Oxygen is obtained via a tracheal system. Air enters a series of tubes along the body through openings called spiracles, and is then taken into increasingly finer fibers. Pumping movements of the body force the air through the system. Some species of diving beetles (Dytiscidae) carry a bubble of air with them whenever they dive beneath the water surface. This bubble may be held under the elytra, or it may be trapped against the body using specialized hairs. The bubble usually covers one or more spiracles so the insect can breathe air from the bubble while submerged. An air bubble provides an insect with only a short-term supply of oxygen, but thanks to its unique physical properties, oxygen will diffuse into the bubble and displacing the nitrogen, called passive diffusion, however the volume of the bubble eventually diminishes, and the beetle will have to return to the surface.

Like other insect species, beetles have hemolymph instead of blood. The open circulatory system of the beetle is driven by a tube-like heart attached to the top inside of the thorax.

Different glands specialize for different pheromones produced for finding mates. Pheromones from species of Rutelinae are produced from epithelial cells lining the inner surface of the apical abdominal segments or amino acid-based pheromones of Melolonthinae from eversible glands on the abdominal apex. Other species produce different types of pheromones. Dermestids produce esters, and species of Elateridae produce fatty-acid-derived aldehydes and acetates. For means of finding a mate also, fireflies (Lampyridae) utilized modified fat body cells with transparent surfaces backed with reflective uric acid crystals to biosynthetically produce light, or bioluminescence. The light produce is highly efficient, as it is produced by oxidation of luciferin by the enzymes luciferase in the presence of ATP (adenosine triphosphate) and oxygen, producing oxyluciferin, carbon dioxide, and light.

Many species have developed special glands that produce chemicals for deterring predators (see Defense and predation). The Ground beetle's (of Carabidae) defensive glands, located at the posterior, produce a variety of hydrocarbons, aldehydes, phenols, quinones, esters, and acids released from an opening at the end of the abdomen. While African carabid beetles (e.g., Anthia some of which used to comprise the genus Thermophilum) employ the same chemicals as ants: formic acid. While Bombardier beetles have well-developed, like other carabid beetles, pygidial glands that empty from the lateral edges of the intersegment membranes between the seventh and eighth abdominal segments. The gland is made of two containing chambers. The first holds hydroquinones and hydrogen peroxide, with the second holding just hydrogen peroxide plus catalases. These chemicals mix and result in an explosive ejection, forming temperatures of around 100 C, with the breakdown of hydroquinone to H_{2} + O_{2} + quinone, with the O_{2} propelling the excretion.

Tympanal organs are hearing organs. Such an organ is generally a membrane (tympanum) stretched across a frame backed by an air sac and associated sensory neurones. In the order Coleoptera, tympanal organs have been described in at least two families. Several species of the genus Cicindela in the family Cicindelidae have ears on the dorsal surface of the first abdominal segment beneath the wing; two tribes in the family Dynastinae (Scarabaeidae) have ears just beneath the pronotal shield or neck membrane. The ears of both families are to ultrasonic frequencies, with strong evidence that they function to detect the presence of bats via their ultrasonic echolocation. Even though beetles constitute a large order and live in a variety of niches, examples of hearing is surprisingly lacking in species, though it is likely that most are just undiscovered.

=== Dermaptera ===
The neuroendocrine system is typical of insects. There is a brain, a subesophageal ganglion, three thoracic ganglia, and six abdominal ganglia. Strong neurone connections connect the neurohemal corpora cardiaca to the brain and frontal ganglion, where the closely related median corpus allatum produces juvenile hormone III in close proximity to the neurohemal dorsal aorta. The digestive system of earwigs is like all other insects, consisting of a fore-, mid-, and hindgut, but earwigs lack gastric caecae which are specialized for digestion in many species of insect. Long, slender (extratory) malpighian tubules can be found between the junction of the mid- and hind gut.

The reproductive system of females consist of paired ovaries, lateral oviducts, spermatheca, and a genital chamber. The lateral ducts are where the eggs leave the body, while the spermatheca is where sperm is stored. Unlike other insects, the gonopore, or genital opening is behind the seventh abdominal segment. The ovaries are primitive in that they are polytrophic (the nurse cells and oocytes alternate along the length of the ovariole). In some species these long ovarioles branch off the lateral duct, while in others, short ovarioles appear around the duct.

=== Diptera ===
The genitalia of female flies are rotated to a varying degree from the position found in other insects. In some flies this is a temporary rotation during mating, but in others it is a permanent torsion of the organs that occurs during the pupal stage. This torsion may lead to the anus being located below the genitals, or, in the case of 360° torsion, to the sperm duct being wrapped around the gut, despite the external organs being in their usual position. When flies mate, the male initially flies on top of the female, facing in the same direction, but then turns round to face in the opposite direction. This forces the male to lie on its back in order for its genitalia to remain engaged with those of the female, or the torsion of the male genitals allows the male to mate while remaining upright. This leads to flies having more reproduction abilities than most insects and at a much quicker rate. Flies come in great populations due to their ability to mate effectively and in a short period of time especially during the mating season.

The female lays her eggs as close to the food source as possible, and development is very rapid, allowing the larva to consume as much food as possible in a short period of time before transforming into the adult. The eggs hatch soon after being laid, or the flies are ovoviviparous, with the larva hatching inside the mother. Larval flies, or maggots, have no true legs, and little demarcation between the thorax and abdomen; in the more derived species, the head is not distinguishable from the rest of the body. Maggots are limbless, or else have small prolegs. The eyes and antennae are reduced or absent, and the abdomen also lacks appendages such as cerci. This lack of features is an adaptation to a food-rich environment, such as within rotting organic matter, or as an endoparasite. The pupae take various forms, and in some cases develop inside a silk cocoon. After emerging from the pupa, the adult fly rarely lives more than a few days, and serves mainly to reproduce and to disperse in search of new food sources.

=== Lepidoptera ===
In reproductive system of butterflies and moths, the male genitalia are complex and unclear. In females, there are three types of genitalia based on the relating taxa: monotrysian, exoporian, and dytresian. In the monotrysian type, there is an opening on the fused segments of the sterna 9 and 10, which act as insemination and oviposition. In the exoporian type (in Hepialoidea and Mnesarchaeoidea), there are two separate places for insemination and oviposition, both occurring on the same sterna as the monotrysian type, 9/10. In most species the genitalia are flanked by two soft lobes, although they may be specialized and sclerotized in some species for ovipositing in area such as crevices and inside plant tissue. Hormones and the glands that produce them run the development of butterflies and moths as they go through their life cycle, called the endocrine system. The first insect hormone PTTH (Prothoracicotropic hormone) operates the species life cycle and diapause (see the relates section). This hormone is produced by corpora allata and corpora cardiaca, where it is also stored. Some glands are specialized to perform certain task such as producing silk or producing saliva in the palpi. While the corpora cardiaca produce PTTH, the corpora allata also produces juvenile hormones, and the prothorocic glands produce moulting hormones.

In the digestive system, the anterior region of the foregut has been modified to form a pharyngeal sucking pump as they need it for the food they eat, which are for the most part liquids. An esophagus follows and leads to the posterior of the pharynx and in some species forms a form of crop. The midgut is short and straight, with the hindgut being longer and coiled. Ancestors of lepidopteran species, stemming from Hymenoptera, had midgut ceca, although this is lost in current butterflies and moths. Instead, all the digestive enzymes other than initial digestion, are immobilized at the surface of the midgut cells. In larvae, long-necked and stalked goblet cells are found in the anterior and posterior midgut regions, respectively. In insects, the goblet cells excrete positive potassium ions, which are absorbed from leaves ingested by the larvae. Most butterflies and moths display the usual digestive cycle, however species that have a different diet require adaptations to meet these new demands.

In the circulatory system, hemolymph, or insect blood, is used to circulate heat in a form of thermoregulation, where muscles contraction produces heat, which is transferred to the rest of the body when conditions are unfavorable. In lepidopteran species, hemolymph is circulated through the veins in the wings by some form of pulsating organ, either by the heart or by the intake of air into the trachea. Air is taken in through spiracles along the sides of the abdomen and thorax supplying the trachea with oxygen as it goes through the lepidopteran's respiratory system. There are three different tracheae supplying oxygen diffusing oxygen throughout the species body: The dorsal, ventral, and visceral. The dorsal tracheae supply oxygen to the dorsal musculature and vessels, while the ventral tracheae supply the ventral musculature and nerve cord, and the visceral tracheae supply the guts, fat bodies, and gonads.

== See also ==
- Morphology (biology)
- Insect physiology
- External morphology of Lepidoptera
- External morphology of Odonata
- Insect ecology
- Entomology
