= Lateral horn of insect brain =

The lateral horn (lateral protocerebrum) is one of the two areas of the insect brain where projection neurons of the antennal lobe send their axons. The other area is the mushroom body. Several morphological classes of neurons in the lateral horn receive olfactory information through the projection neurons.

In lateral horn, axons of pheromone-sensitive projection neurons are segregated from the axons of plant odor-sensitive projection neurons. In addition, the dendrites of lateral horn neurons are restricted to one of these two zones, suggesting that pheromones and plant odors are processed separately in the lateral horn.

Lateral horn neurons responsive to non-pheromonal odors arborize widely in the lateral horn, possibly integrating information from a large number of projection neurons (even if the projection neurons themselves project only to specific regions of the lateral horn). Intracellular recordings from lateral horn neurons show that many of these neurons respond broadly to odors. Responses in these neurons are synchronized to odor-evoked oscillations, and depend on odor concentration.

== Physiology ==
The olfactory receptor neurons in the antenna and maxillary palps project into the olfactory lobes of the insect brain, which in turn project the higher order processing centers, the lateral horn or the mushroom bodies. The lateral horn has vague boundaries in the brain but is bordered by the ends of the branching of projecting neurons in the lateral protocerebrum. There are at least 10 morphological classes of lateral horn neurons. This system is highly conserved throughout the insect world.

Insects need an area that integrates olfactory information because they use olfaction as their primary means of gaining information about their world. They must assign a "valence" (attraction or aversion behavior) to important odors like poisonous food (aversion), mates (attraction) or colony members (situational). The lateral horn is the brain region that accomplishes this olfactory information integration. It coordinates behaviors innate (instinctual) behaviors with certain odors.

The antennal lobe has two types of neurons that synapse with the olfactory receptor neurons in the antennae and maxillary palps, the local interneurons and projection neurons. The projection neurons can excite or inhibit action potentials in the mushroom body or lateral horn to which they project. They project to the mushroom body is a random fashion but are very stereotyped in their projections to the lateral horn, making it easier to study in some ways.

== Learned olfactory response ==
While generally the lateral horn is said to be responsible for innate behavioral responses to olfactory stimuli and the mushroom bodies is responsible for learned behavior we now have a growing body of evidence that cross-talk between the two regions which means the true nature is more complicated than that.

When an insect encounters an odor to which it has no innate or learned response associated (an unconditioned stimulus), the signals are sent down the projecting neurons to the Kenyon cells of the mushroom bodies. Kenyon cells (among other things) regulates "memory acquisition, consolidation, and retrieval of short- and long-term memories". While the reason is not currently known, the same projecting neurons that synapse with these Kenyon cells also synapse with the cells in the lateral horn. This provides further evidence of a more complicated connection between the lateral horn and learned behaviors.

Cross-talk between the lateral lobe and the mushroom bodies adds flexibility to learned and innate behavioral responses. An odor may be associated with an attractive behavior, leading most insects of a species to move towards the source of that odor, yet some individuals may move away from that odor because of a past negative encounter with it. So the learned behavioral signal from the mushroom bodies can overrule the innate behavior signal emanating from the lateral horn.

Conversely, the innate behavioral signal from the lateral horn can also overrule the learned behavior signal from the mushroom bodies. For example, the integration of learned and innate behavioral responses is especially important in social insects such as honeybees. Honey bees use pheromones and specific body movements to communicate with other members of the hive. Bees learn what flower odors are associated with good sources of nectar (leading to the proboscis extension response behavior) but if they are exposed to the sting alarm pheromone, sent by other bees, while learning which flowers scents are associated with the most food their learning is impaired. This is because the "stop" behavior associated with the sting alarm pheromone is an innate response mediated by the lateral horn which is strong enough to overrule the learned feeding behavior.

== Sexual dimorphism ==
Male and female insects have drastically different behavioral responses when encountering pheromones of the opposite or same sex; thus, the neurophysiology there must be a difference between the two sexes. Because the lateral horn is associated with the integration of odors resulting in stereotyped behaviors we would expect to see a physical difference between male and female lateral horns, and we do. There is sex-specific wiring that initiates sex-specific cell clusters in the insect brain when they are exposed to sex pheromones.

A good example of this is the fact that the male drosophila's lateral horn is 1% larger than females of the same species. The male lateral horn has abundant connections with the projecting neurons that come from the DA1, VA1lm and VL2a glomeruli of the antenal lobe (all of which are also larger in males). Each of these glomeruli are associated with the specific olfactory neurons that pick up pheromones. In moths the male-specific projecting pheromone-processing neurons innervate with glomeruli outside of the macroglomerular complex of the antennal lobe.

Other studies in drosophila found that it is not just the neurons responsible for incoming information that are sexually dimorphic but also the lateral horn neurons that are sending information to the rest of the fly. The lateral horn neurons that synapse with the ventral nerve cord are dimorphic in their structure and respond to the drosophila sex pheromone cVA.
