= Lateral accessory lobes =

Lateral accessory lobes, or LALs are paired, symmetrical, systems of synaptic neuropils that exist in the brains of insects and other arthropods. Lateral accessory lobes are located inferiorly and laterally from the ellipsoid body, anteriorly and laterally from the bulb. In the frontal section of the arthropod brain the LALs are projected as two triangles, called lateral triangles. The LALs have a roughly pyramidal shape.

== Anatomy ==
The LALs are located behind the antennal lobes and in front of the ventral nervous complex. The two LALs, left and right, are interconnected by the commissure of lateral accessory lobes.

== Synonyms ==
Lateral accessory lobes are synonymous with the ventral part of the inferior dorsofrontal protocerebrum of the arthropod brain.

== Physiology and function ==
There is some evidence that lateral accessory lobes take part in sensory processing and integration in the arthropod brain.

== Proposed homology of the arthropod LAL and the thalamus of the chordates ==
In 2013, one author published a controversial article equating some parts of arthropod central complex with the basal ganglia of chordates, and the LALs of the arthropods with the nigro-receptive part of the thalamus of chordates. The proposed homology was based on the anatomical analogy in the location of those structures in the brain, on the analogous physiological functions of those structures, and, more importantly, on the patterns of gene expression during embryogenesis and later stages of ontogenesis of those structures.
