= Dorsal lobe =

Anatomical structure in arthropods

The dorsal lobe of arthropods is also known as the antennal mechanosensory center in contrast to the Optic lobe (visual center) and the antennal lobe (olfactory center). Together with the antennal lobe, it makes up the arthropod "midbrain" or deutocerebrum.
