= Olfactory lobe =

Olfactory lobe may refer to:

- Olfactory bulb in vertebrates
- Antennal lobe in insects
