= Frederick C. Kenyon =

American zoologist (1867–1941)

Frederick Courtland Kenyon
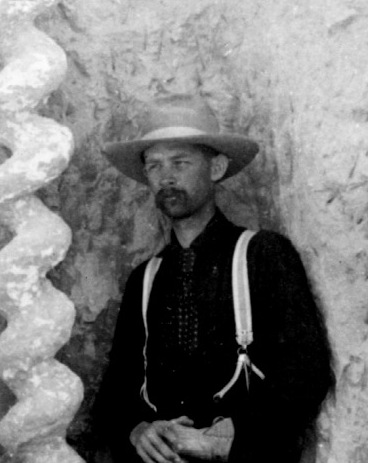
- Kenyon at the Agate Fossil Beds (1893)
- Born: 22 November 1867; Hartford, Connecticut, US
- Died: 11 January 1941 (aged 73); Washington, D.C.
- Education: University of Nebraska Tufts University
- Known for: Kenyon cells
- Scientific career
- Fields: Zoology, Anatomy
- Workplaces: Clark University
- Author abbrev. (zoology): F. C. Kenyon

Frederick Courtland Kenyon (November 22, 1867 – January 11, 1941) was an American zoologist and anatomist, the first person to research the inner anatomy of the insect brain. In 1896, he published a paper in which he described for the first time the neurons in the mushroom bodies of the honey bee. Later, the same neurons were discovered in other insects and were called Kenyon cells.

Frederick C. Kenyon was born in Hartford, Connecticut, the son of a shoe merchant. In 1887, he moved with his family to Lincoln, Nebraska, where in 1893 he received a bachelor's degree from the University of Nebraska. He received his doctorate in 1895 from Tufts University, where he studied Pauropoda centipedes. He worked for about two years at Clark University, where, in 1896, he prepared his famous work on the mushroom bodies of the honey bee.

He was the first scientist to find and characterize within any organism identifiable classes of neuron types linked to particular areas of the brain, documenting these in extremely detailed anatomical drawings. Kenyon correctly suggested that there were tens of thousands of the eponymous cells he'd discovered for each mushroom body and that these bodies were the site of multisensory integration.

In his early thirties he began to display strange behavior, and on November 25, 1899, he was committed to a psychiatric hospital in Washington, D.C., where he remained, seemingly without the possibility of rehabilitation, for over forty-one years.
