= Kenyon cell =

Neuron in the brain of arthropods

Kenyon cells are the intrinsic neurons of the mushroom body, a neuropil found in the brains of most arthropods and some annelids. They were first described by Frederick C. Kenyon in 1896. The number of Kenyon cells in an organism varies greatly between species. For example, in the fruit fly, Drosophila melanogaster, there are about 2,500 Kenyon cells per mushroom body, while in cockroaches there are about 230,000.

== Structure ==
While the exact features of Kenyon cells can vary between species, there are enough similarities to define their general structure. Kenyon cells have dendritic branches that arborize in the calyx or calyces, cup-shaped regions of the mushroom body. At the base of the calyces, Kenyon cell axons come together and form a bundle known as the pedunculus. At the end of the pedunculus, Kenyon cell axons bifurcate and extend branches into the vertical and medial lobes.

Kenyon cells are mainly postsynaptic in the calyces, where their synapses form microglomeruli. These microglomeruli are made up of Kenyon cell dendrites, cholinergic boutons, and GABAergic terminals. Antennal lobe projection neurons are the source of the cholinergic input, and the GABAergic input is from protocerebral neurons.

Kenyon cells are presynaptic to mushroom body output neurons in the lobes. However, the lobes are not only output regions; Kenyon cells are both pre and postsynaptic in these regions.

The cells are subdivided into subtypes; for example, those that have their cell bodies outside of the calyx cup are called clawed Kenyon cells.

== Development ==
Kenyon cells are produced from precursors known as neuroblasts. The number of neuroblasts varies greatly between species. In Drosophila melanogaster, Kenyon cells are produced from only four neuroblasts, while in the honey bee they are the product of thousands of neuroblasts. Differences in neuroblast number between species are related to the final number of Kenyon cells in an adult.

The positioning of Kenyon cells depends on their birth order. The somata of early-born Kenyon cells are pushed outward as more Kenyon cells are created. This results in a concentric pattern of cell bodies, with the somata of the last-born cells in the center, where the neuroblast had been, and the somata of the first-born cells at the outermost margins of the cell body area. Where a Kenyon cell sends its dendrites in the calyces and which lobes it projects its axons to varies based on its birth-order. Distinct types of Kenyon cells form at specific times during development.

== Function ==
Mushroom bodies are essential for olfactory learning and memory. Odor information is represented by sparse combinations of Kenyon cells. Learning is facilitated by dopamine-driven plasticity of the odor response of Kenyon cells. The cAMP signaling cascade, especially protein kinase A, must function properly in Kenyon cells for learning and memory to occur.

Information about odors may be encoded in the mushroom body by the identities of the responsive neurons as well as the timing of their spikes. Experiments in locusts have shown that Kenyon cells have their activity synchronized to 20-Hz neural oscillations and are particularly responsive to projection neuron spikes at specific phases of the oscillatory cycle.
