= Mushroom bodies =

Pair of structures in the brains of some arthropods and annelids

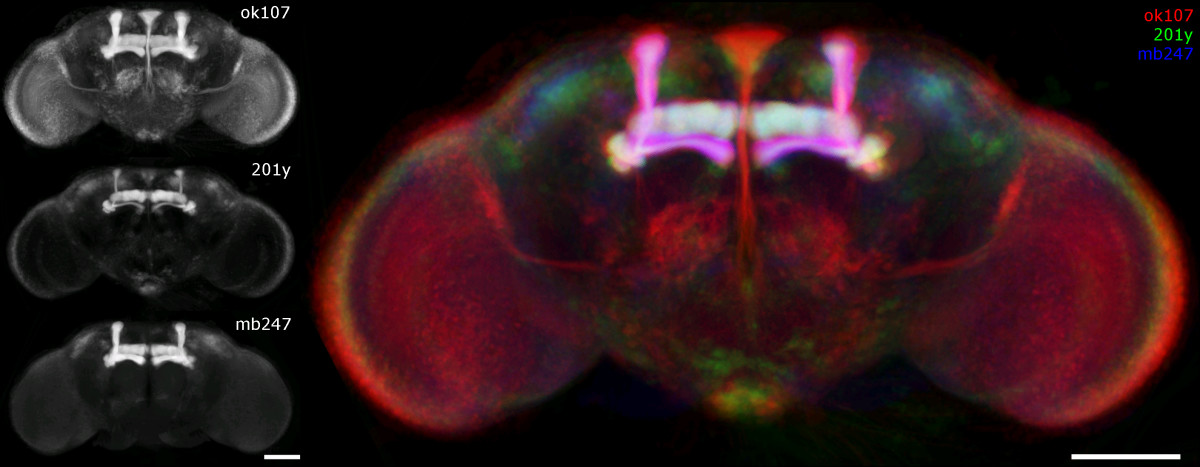
Mushroom bodies visible in a Drosophila brain as two stalks. From Jenett et al., 2006

The mushroom bodies or corpora pedunculata are a pair of structures in the brain of arthropods (including insects and crustaceans), and polychaete annelids (notably the ragworm Platynereis dumerilii). They are known to play a role in olfactory learning and memory. In most insects, the mushroom bodies and the lateral horn are the two higher brain regions that receive olfactory information from the antennal lobe via projection neurons. They were first identified and described by French biologist Félix Dujardin in 1850.

== Structure ==
Mushroom bodies are usually described as neuropils, i.e., as dense networks of neuronal processes (dendrite and axon terminals) and glia. They get their name from their roughly hemispherical calyx, a protuberance that is joined to the rest of the brain by a central nerve tract or peduncle.

Most of our current knowledge of mushroom bodies comes from studies of a few species of insect, especially the cockroach Periplaneta americana, the honey bee Apis mellifera, the locust and the fruit fly Drosophila melanogaster. Studies of fruit fly mushroom bodies have been particularly important for understanding the genetic basis of mushroom body functioning, since their genome has been sequenced and a vast number of tools to manipulate their gene expression exist.

In the insect brain, the peduncles of the mushroom bodies extend through the midbrain. They are mainly composed of the long, densely packed nerve fibres of the Kenyon cells, the intrinsic neurons of the mushroom bodies, first described by Frederick C. Kenyon in 1896. These cells have been found in the mushroom bodies of all species that have been investigated, though their number varies. Fruit flies, for example, have around 2,500, whereas cockroaches have about 200,000.

A locust brain dissection to expose the central brain and carry out electro-physiology recordings can be seen here.

== Evolutionary history ==
Historically, it was believed that only insects had mushroom bodies, because they were not present in crabs and lobsters. However, their discovery in the mantis shrimp in 2017 lead to the later conclusion that the mushroom body is the ancestral state of all arthropods, and that this feature was later lost in crabs and lobsters. Using immunostaining, homologous lobate structures with a common ground pattern of chemosensory afferents supplying thousands of intrinsi/local neurons (the olfactory cascade) were found in arachnids and many groups of Lophotrochozoa: polychaete annelids, polyclad planarians, and nemerteans. Altogether this indicates a common origin, suggesting that this arrangement is present in the ancestral state.

The annelid mushroom body is homologous to the vertebrate cerebral cortex, according to expression profiling by image registration. This likely indicates independent elaborations on a common simple ancestral structure.

== Function ==
Mushroom bodies are best known for their role in olfactory associative learning. These olfactory signals are received from dopaminergic, octopaminergic, cholinergic, serotonergic, and GABAergic neurons outside the MB. They are largest in the Hymenoptera, which are known to have particularly elaborate control over olfactory behaviours. However, since mushroom bodies are also found in anosmic primitive insects, their role is likely to extend beyond olfactory processing. Anatomical studies suggest a role in the processing of visual and mechanosensory input in some species. In Hymenoptera in particular, subregions of the mushroom body neuropil are specialized to receive olfactory, visual, or both types of sensory input. In Hymenoptera, olfactory input is layered in the calyx. In ants, several layers can be discriminated, corresponding to different clusters of glomeruli in the antennal lobes, perhaps for processing different classes of odors. There are two main groups of projection neurons dividing the antennal lobe into two main regions, anterior and posterior. Projection neuron groups are segregated, innervating glomerular groups separately and sending axons by separate routes, either through the medial-antenno protocerebral tract (m-APT) or through the lateral-antenno protocerebral tract (l-APT), and connecting with two layers in the calyx of the mushroom bodies. In these layers the organization of the two efferent regions of the antennal lobe is represented topographically, establishing a coarse odotopic map of the antennal lobe in the region of the lip of the mushroom bodies.

Mushroom bodies are known to be involved in learning and memory, particularly for smell, and thus are the subject of current intense research. In larger insects, studies suggest that mushroom bodies have other learning and memory functions, like associative memory, sensory filtering, motor control, and place memory. Research implies that mushroom bodies generally act as a sort of coincidence detector, integrating multi-modal inputs and creating novel associations, thus suggesting their role in learning and memory. Recent work also shows evidence for the involvement of the mushroom body in innate olfactory behaviors through interactions with the lateral horn, possibly making use of the partially stereotyped sensory responses of the mushroom body output neurons (MBONs) across individuals. Although the connections between the projection neurons and the Kenyon cells are random (i.e., not stereotyped across individuals), the stereotypy in MBON responses is made possible by the dense convergence of many Kenyon cells onto a few MBONs along with other network properties.

Information about odors may be encoded in the mushroom body by the identities of the responsive neurons as well as the timing of their spikes. Experiments in locusts have shown that Kenyon cells have their activity synchronized to 20-Hz neural oscillations and are particularly responsive to projection neuron spikes at specific phases of the oscillatory cycle.

=== Sleep ===
The neurons which receive signals from serotonergic and GABAergic neurons outside the MB produce wakefulness, and experimentally stimulating these serotonergic upstream neurons forces sleep. The target neurons in the MB are inhibited by serotonin, GABA, and the combination of both. On the other hand octopamine does not seem to affect the MB's sleep function.

== Drosophila melanogaster ==
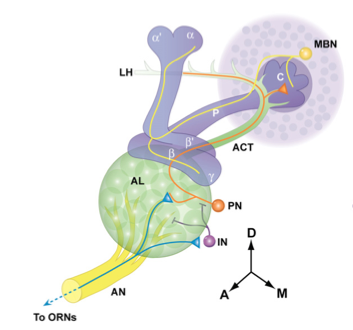
Mushroom body lobes of D. melanogaster, with α/β, α'/β', and γ neurons visible. From Davis, 2011

We know that mushroom body structures are important for olfactory learning and memory in Drosophila because their ablation destroys this function. The mushroom body is also able to combine information from the internal state of the body and the olfactory input to determine innate behavior. The exact roles of the specific neurons making up the mushroom bodies are still unclear. However, these structures are studied extensively because much is known about their genetic make-up. There are three specific classes of neurons that make up the mushroom body lobes: α/β, α'/β', and γ neurons, which all have distinct gene expression. A topic of current research is which of these substructures in the mushroom body are involved in each phase and process of learning and memory. Drosophila mushroom bodies are also often used to study learning and memory and are manipulated due to their relatively discrete nature. Typically, olfactory learning assays consist of exposing flies to two odors separately; one is paired with electric shock pulses (the conditioned stimulus, or CS+), and the second is not (unconditioned stimulus, or US). After this training period, flies are placed in a T-maze with the two odors placed individually on either end of the horizontal 'T' arms. The percent of flies that avoid the CS+ is calculated, with high avoidance considered evidence of learning and memory.

=== Cellular memory traces ===
Recent studies combining odor conditioning and cellular imaging have identified six memory traces that coincide with molecular changes in the Drosophila olfactory system. Three of these traces are associated with early forming behavioral memory. One such trace was visualized in the antennal lobe (AL) by synapto-pHluorin reporter molecules. Immediately after conditioning, an additional set of projection neurons in a set of eight glomeruli in the AL becomes synaptically activated by the conditioned odor, and lasts for only 7 minutes. A second trace is detectable by GCaMP expression, and thus an increase in Ca^{2+} influx, in the α'/β' axons of the mushroom body neurons. This is a longer-lasting trace, present for up to one hour following conditioning. The third memory trace is the reduction of activity of the anterior-paired lateral neuron, which acts as a memory formation suppressor through one of its inhibitory GABAergic receptors. Decrease in calcium response of APL neurons and subsequent decrease in GABA release onto the mushroom bodies persisted up to 5 minutes after odor conditioning.

The intermediate term memory trace is dependent on expression of the amn gene located in dorsal paired medial neurons. An increase in calcium influx and synaptic release that innervates the mushroom bodies becomes detectable approximately 30 minutes after pairing of electric shock with an odor, and persists for at least an hour. Both long-term memory traces that have been mapped depend on activity and protein synthesis of CREB and CaMKII, and only exist after spaced conditioning. The first trace is detected in α/β neurons between 9 and 24 hours after conditioning, and is characterized by an increase in calcium influx in response to the conditioned odor. The second long-term memory trace forms in the γ mushroom bodies and is detected by increase calcium influx between 18 and 24 hours after conditioning

=== cAMP dynamics ===
Cyclic adenosine monophosphate (cAMP or cyclic AMP) is a second messenger that has been implicated in facilitating mushroom body calcium influx in Drosophila melanogaster mushroom body neurons. cAMP elevation induces presynaptic plasticity in Drosophila. cAMP levels are affected by both neurotransmitters, such as dopamine and octopamine, and odors themselves. Dopamine and octopamine are released by mushroom body interneurons, while odors directly activate neurons in the olfactory pathway, causing calcium influx through voltage-gated calcium channels.

In a classical conditioning paradigm, pairing neuronal depolarization (via acetylcholine application to represent the odor or CS) with subsequent dopamine application (to represent the shock or US), results in a synergistic increase in cAMP in the mushroom body lobes. These results suggest that the mushroom body lobes are a critical site of CS/US integration via the action of cAMP. This synergistic effect was originally observed in Aplysia, where pairing calcium influx with activation of G protein signaling by serotonin generates a similar synergistic increase in cAMP.

Additionally, this synergistic increase in cAMP is mediated by and dependent on rutabaga adenylyl cyclase (rut AC), which is sensitive to both calcium (which results from voltage-gated calcium channel opening by odors) and G protein stimulation (caused by dopamine). While a forward pairing of neuronal depolarization and dopamine, (acetylcholine followed by dopamine) results in a synergistic increase in cAMP, a forward pairing of neuronal depolarization and octopamine produces a sub-additive effect on cAMP. More specifically, this means that this pairing produces significantly less cAMP than the sum of each stimulus individually in the lobes. Therefore, rut AC in mushroom body neurons works as a coincidence detector with dopamine and octopamine functioning bidirectionally to affect cAMP levels.

=== PKA dynamics ===
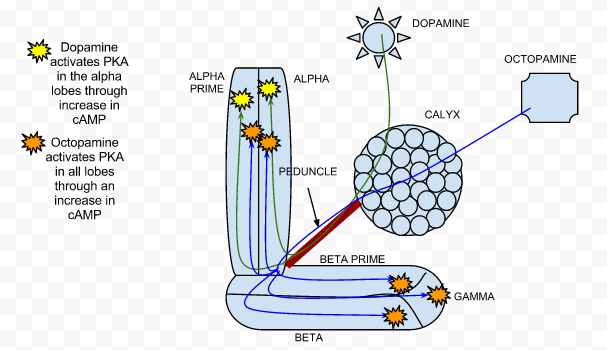
Spatial regulation of PKA dynamics in Drosophila mushroom body.

Protein kinase A (PKA) has been found to play an important role in learning and memory in Drosophila. When calcium enters a cell and binds with calmodulin, it stimulates adenylate cyclase (AC), which is encoded by the rutabaga gene (rut). This AC activation increases the concentration of cAMP, which activates PKA. When dopamine, an aversive olfactory stimulant, is applied it activates PKA specifically in the vertical mushroom body lobes. This spatial specificity is regulated by the dunce (dnc) PDE, a cAMP-specific phosphodiesterase. If the dunce gene is abolished, as found in the dnc mutant, the spatial specificity is not maintained. In contrast, an appetitive stimulation created by an octopamine application increases PKA in all lobes. In the rut mutant, a genotype in which the rutabaga is abolished, the responses to both dopamine and octopamine were greatly reduced and close to experimental noise.

Acetylcholine, which represents the conditioned stimulus, leads to a strong increase in PKA activation compared to stimulation with dopamine or octopamine alone. This reaction is abolished in rut mutants, which demonstrates that PKA is essential for sensory integration. The specificity of activation of the alpha lobe in the presence of dopamine is maintained when dopamine is in combination with acetylcholine. Essentially, during a conditioning paradigm when a conditioned stimulus is paired with an unconditioned stimulus, PKA exhibits heightened activation. This shows that PKA is required for conditioned learning in Drosophila melanogaster.

== Apis mellifera ==
Stimulus → output responses are the product of pairs of excitation and inhibition. This is the same pattern of organisation as with mammals' brains. These patterns may, as with mammals, precede action. As of 2021 this is an area only recently elucidated by Zwaka et al. 2018, Duer et al. 2015, and Paffhausen et al. 2020.

== See also ==
- Cerebral cortex
