= Rutabaga (gene) =

Ca(2+)/calmodulin-responsive adenylate cyclase

Identifiers
- Organism: Drosophila melanogaster
- Symbol: rut
- UniProt: P32870
Search for
- Structures: Swiss-model
- Domains: InterPro

Rutabaga (rut) is the name of the gene encoding calcium-sensitive dependent adenylate cyclase in fruit flies. Rutabaga has been implicated in a number of functions, including learning and memory, behavior, and cell communication. Its human homolog is ADCY1.
