= Composition of the protocerebrum =

First segment of the panarthropod brain

The protocerebrum is the first segment of the panarthropod brain.

Recent studies suggest that it comprises two regions.

== Region associated with the expression of six3 ==
six3 is a transcription factor that marks the anteriormost part of the developing body in a whole host of Metazoa.

In the panarthropod brain, the anteriormost (rostralmost) part of the germband expresses six3. This region is described as medial, and corresponds to the annelid prostomium.

In arthropods, it contains the pars intercerebralis and pars lateralis.

six3 is associated with the euarthropod labrum and the onychophoran frontal appendages (antennae).

== Region associated with the expression of orthodenticle ==
The other region expresses homologues of orthodenticle, Otx or otd. This region is more caudal and lateral, and bears the eyes.

Orthodenticle is associated with the protocerebral bridge, part of the central complex, traditionally a marker of the prosocerebrum.

In the annelid brain, Otx expression characterises the peristomium, but also creeps forwards into the regions of the prostomium that bear the larval eyes.

== Names of regions ==
Inconsistent use of the terms archicerebrum and the prosocerebrum makes them confusing.

The regions were defined by Siewing (1963): the archicerebrum as containing the ocular lobes and the mushroom bodies (= corpora pedunculata), and the prosocerebrum as comprising the central complex.

The archicerebrum has traditionally been equated with the anteriormost, 'non-segmental' part of the protocerebrum, equivalent to the acron in older terminology. The prosocerebrum is then equivalent to the 'segmental' part of the protocerebrum, bordered by segment polarity genes such as engrailed, and (on one interpretation) bearing modified segmental appendages (= camera-type eyes).

But Urbach and Technau (2003) complicate the matter by seeing the prosocerebrum (central complex) + labrum as the anteriormost region

- Strausfeld 2016 identifies the anteriormost part of the brain = labrum = acron with the archicerebrum, followed by an engrailed-bounded 'first segment', bearing appendicular eyes, which he terms the prosocerebrum.
- Ortega-Hernández et al. (2017) follow the same model as Strausfeld (2016), but switch the terms prosocerebrum and archicerebrum.
- Archicerebrum = acron, followed by 'labral segment' / 'first head segment': Schmidt-Ott U., González-Gaitán M., Technau G.M. (1995). "Analysis of neural elements in head-mutant Drosophila embryos suggests segmental origin of the optic lobes". Roux's Archives of Developmental Biology. 205 (1–2): 31–44. doi:10.1007/bf00188841. hdl:11858/00-001M-0000-0013-02C8-A. PMID 28306063. S2CID 9232602.
- Urbach & Technau say that the archicerebrum = acron = ocular segment = first three protocerebral lobes bears optic lobes and mushroom bodies, and lacks engrailed; the prosocerebrum = fourth protocerebral lobe includes "the central complex and the neurosecretory cells of the pars intercerebralis" and corresponds to the labral segment.
- Weygoldt (1985) sees the archicerebrum as anterior to the prosocerebrum, and as being non-segmental (i.e. = acron).
- Hunnekuhl, V.S. and Akam, M. avoid the terms, instead defining an ocular/preantennal region and an anterior medial region (with pars intercerebralis + neurosecretory cell cluster).

An alternative usage of the terms seems to have been introduced by Steinmetz et al (2010), who seem to flip the terms?

- Steinmetz et al. 2010 write "The most anterior part, the

protocerebrum, can be further subdivided into a more lateral region bearing, for example, the optic lobes (archicerebrum) and a median region that includes, for example, the pars intercerebralis (prosocerebrum). Most authors think that the archicerebrum represents the tip of the neuraxis, but this has been disputed."

- Future studies seem to have taken this to denote that the prosocerebrum is the rostralmost part of the body axis, contradicting a long tradition of usage.
