= Gnathal ganglion =

The gnathal ganglion (acronym: GNG, SOG; synonym: sub(o)esophageal ganglion) of arthropods and in particular insects is part of the arthropod central nervous system (CNS). As indicated by its old name, it is located below the oesophagus, inside the head. As part of the ventral nerve cord, it is connected (via pairs of connections) to the cerebral ganglion and to the first thoracic ganglion (or protothoracic ganglion). Its nerves innervate the sensory organs and muscles of the mouthparts and the salivary glands. Neurons in the suboesophageal ganglion control movement of the head and neck as well.

Supraesophageal ganglion(5), Subesophageal ganglion(31)

It is composed of three pairs of fused ganglia, each of which is associated with a pair of mouthparts. Therefore, the fused parts are called the mandibular, maxillary and labial ganglia.
