= Cerebral ganglion =

Arthropod nervous system component

The cerebral ganglion (CNG; also cerebral ganglia, supra(o)esophageal ganglia [SPG], arthropod brain, or microbrain) is the main part of the brain in most insect species and in some other closely related arthropods, such as myriapods and crustaceans. It receives and processes information from the first, second, and third metameres. It is connected to the gnathal ganglion (GNG), a part of the CNS in the head which may or may not be considered part of the brain. (Note: In a standard scheme, the CNG and GNG are both considered the brain. The CRG minus the optic lobe constitutes the cerebrum, similar to how the cerebrum is a part of the brain in vertebrates.)

The cerebral ganglion consists of three parts, each a pair of ganglia that may be more or less pronounced, reduced, or fused depending on the genus:

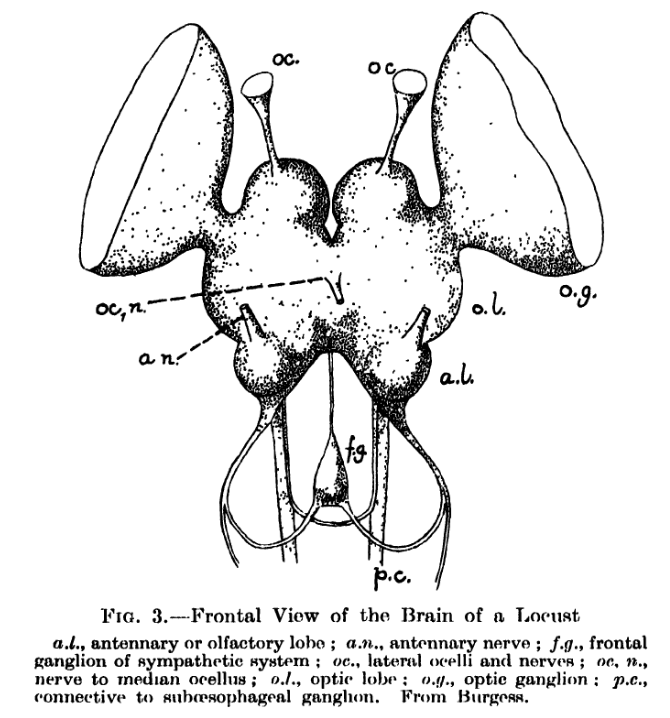
Locust brain

- The protocerebrum, associated with the eyes (compound eyes and ocelli). Directly associated with the eyes is the optic lobe, as the visual center of the brain.
- The deutocerebrum processes sensory information from the antennae. It consists of two parts, the antennal lobe and the dorsal lobe. The dorsal lobe also contains motor neurons which control the antennal muscles.
- The tritocerebrum integrates sensory inputs from the previous two pairs of ganglia. In locusts and cockroaches, lobes of the tritocerebrum split to circumvent the esophagus and begin the subesophageal ganglion.

Supraesophageal ganglion (5), Subesophageal ganglion (31)

The cerebral ganglion lies dorsal to the esophagus in locusts and cockroaches. Contrary to its "supraesophageal" name, it is penetrated by the esophagus during development and remains so in other groups of insects (flies, bees, moths, etc.). In locusts and cockroaches, the parts below the esophagus only remain as thin commissures, hence the original perception of it lying above the esophagus.

The gnathal ganglion continues the nervous system and lies ventral to the esophagus. Finally, the segmental ganglia of the ventral nerve cord are found in each body segment as a fused ganglion; they provide the segments with some autonomous control.

== Homology ==
Similarities of gene expression patterns between insect and vertebrate/mammalian brain indicate that many structural elements derive from common building blocks inherited from a common bilaterian ancestor. For example, the gene circuit defining the midbrain-hindbrain boundary in vertebrates and some other chordates is orthologous to the gene circuit that defines either the deutocerebral–tritocerebral boundary (antennal/intercalary parasegment boundary) or the antennal-ocular boundary ("insect head boundary", IHB) in insects. There is also a correspondence in neural circuits and behavioral functions.

The mushroom bodies of the protocerebrum are homologous to the vertebrate cerebral cortex, according to expression profiling by image registration.

== See also ==
- Lateral horn of insect brain
- Mushroom bodies
- Virtual Fly Brain
- Drosophila connectome
