= Antennal lobe =

Brain area in insects

The antennal lobe is the primary (first order) olfactory brain area in insects. The antennal lobe is a sphere-shaped deutocerebral neuropil in the brain that receives input from the olfactory sensory neurons in the antennae and mouthparts. Functionally, it shares some similarities with the olfactory bulb in vertebrates. The anatomy and physiology function of the insect brain can be studied by dissecting open the insect brain and imaging or carrying out in vivo electrophysiological recordings from it.

== Structure ==
In insects, the olfactory pathway starts at the antennae (though in some insects like Drosophila there are olfactory sensory neurons in other parts of the body) from where the sensory neurons carry the information about the odorant molecules impinging on the antenna to the antennal lobe. The antennal lobe is composed of densely packed neuropils, termed glomeruli, where the sensory neurons synapse with the two other kinds of neurons, the postsynaptic principal neurons (termed projection neurons) and local interneurons. Each olfactory sensory neuron expresses a single odorant receptor type and targets the same glomeruli as other olfactory sensory neurons expressing that receptor type, such that each glomerulus houses all or the majority of sensory neurons of a given receptor type. The number and identities of glomeruli are species specific; most species contain 40 to 160 individually identifiable glomeruli within the antennal lobe. For instance, there are 32 glomeruli in mosquito, 43 glomeruli in the fruit fly antennal lobe, and 203 glomeruli in cockroach. The local neurons, which are primarily inhibitory, have their neurites restricted to the antennal lobe. Projection neurons, which generally receive information from a single glomerulus, project to higher brain centers such as the mushroom body and the lateral horn. The interaction between the olfactory receptor neurons, local neurons and projection neurons reformats the information input from the sensory neurons into a spatio-temporal code before it is sent to higher brain centers.
