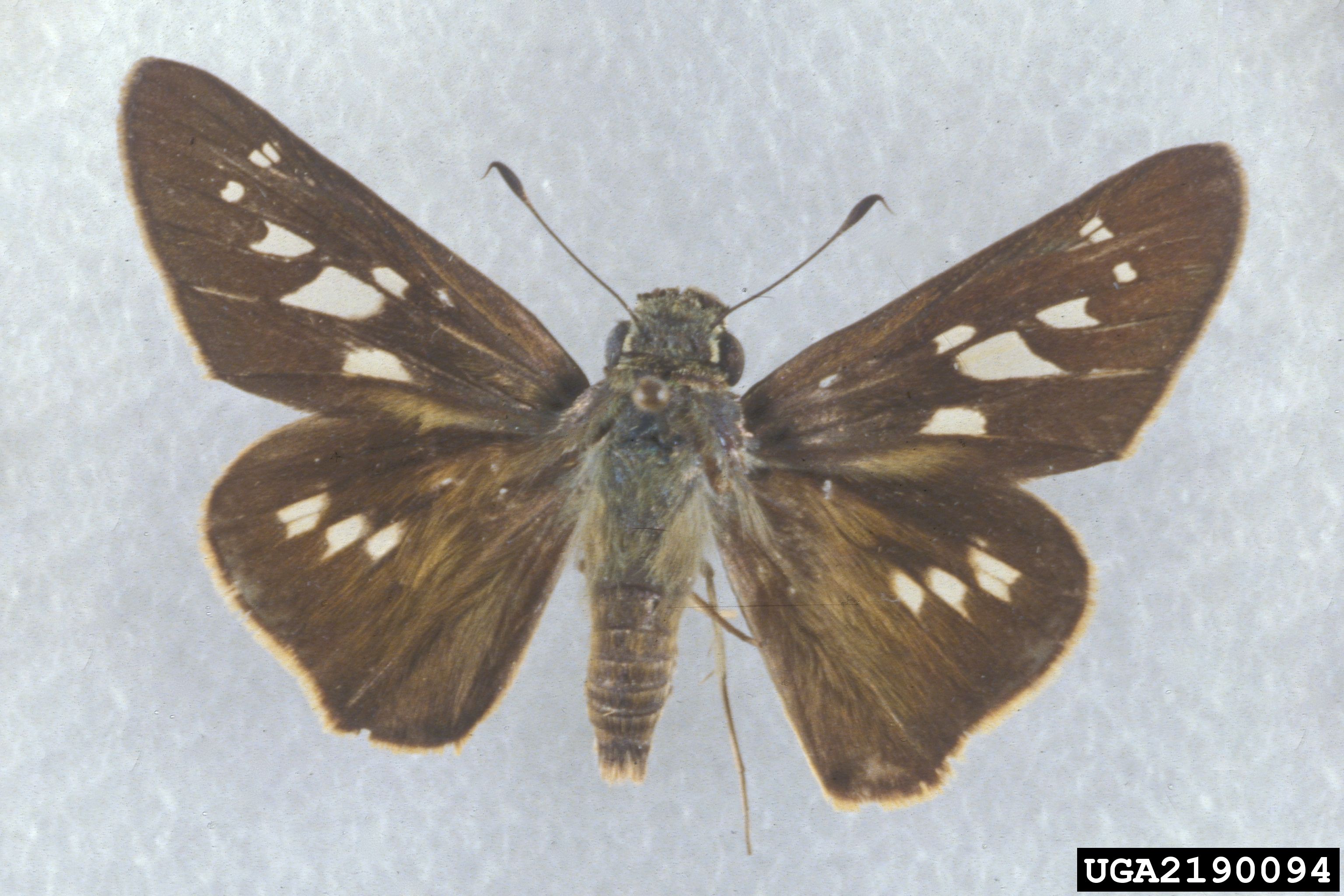

Conservation status
- Secure (NatureServe)

Scientific classification
- Kingdom: Animalia
- Phylum: Arthropoda
- Class: Insecta
- Order: Lepidoptera
- Family: Hesperiidae
- Genus: Calpodes
- Species: C. ethlius

Binomial name
- Calpodes ethlius (Stoll, [1782])

Synonyms
- Eudamus olynthus Boisduval & Le Conte, [1837]; Hesperia chemnis Fabricius, 1793; Papilio ethlius Stoll, [1782]; Calpodes aethlius; Verloren, 1837 (missp.); Calpodes ethelius; Gowdey, 1926 (missp.); Calpodes ethlinus; dos Passos 1964 (missp.); Calpodes ethlicus; Silva, 1967 (missp.); Calpodes ethlis; Kendall & Glick 1973 (missp.); Calpodes ethluis; Gatrelle, 1975 (missp.); Calpodes ethilus; DeVries, 1983 (missp.)

= Calpodes ethlius =

Species of butterfly

Calpodes ethlius, the Brazilian skipper, larger canna leafroller or canna skipper, is a butterfly of the family Hesperiidae. It is found in the United States from southern Florida and southern Texas, south through the West Indies, Mexico, and Central America to Argentina. Strays and temporary colonies can be found north to southern Nevada, northern Texas, Illinois and Massachusetts.

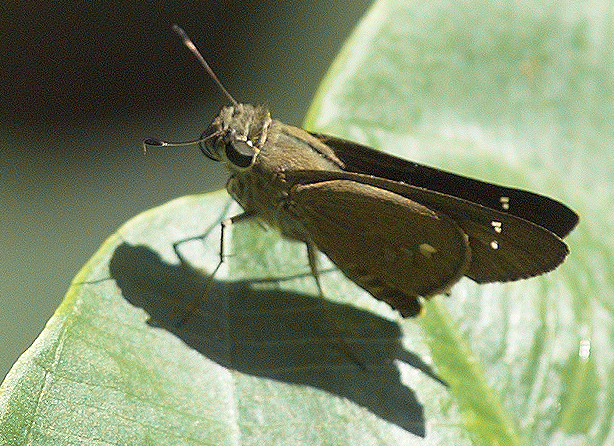

The wingspan is 45–61 mm. Adults are on wing in late summer in the north. There are several generations from April to December in southern Texas, two generations from July to November in Arizona. Adults are on wing throughout the year in Florida and the tropics.

Adults feed on Lantana in Arizona. In Costa Rica, adults have been recorded feeding on the nectar from large white or pale yellow flowers of woody lianas, trees and shrubs.

Larval hosts include Canna spp., in which the larvae roll or fold the ends of leaves into tents.
