= Butterfly Alphabet =

Photographic artwork

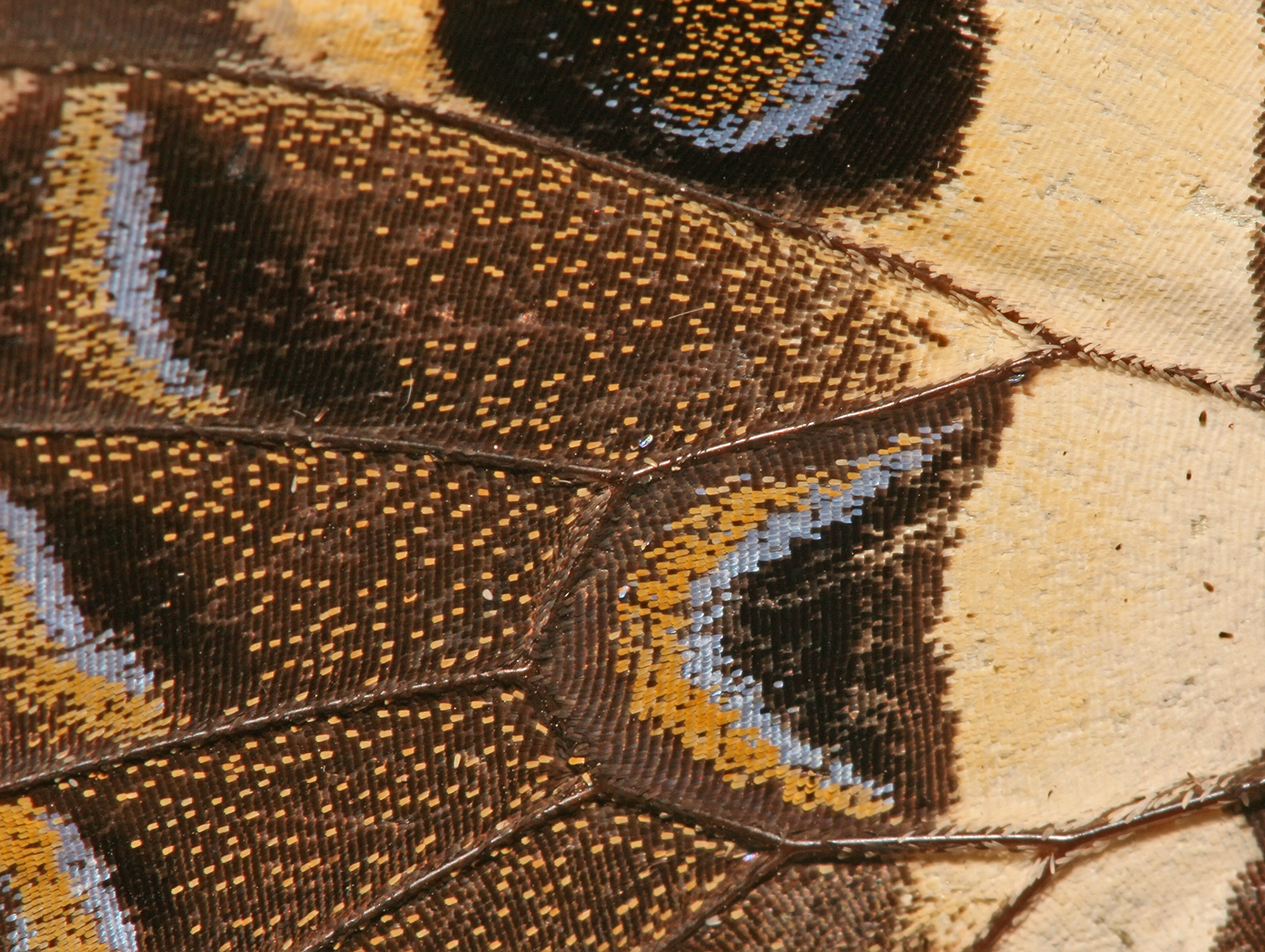
Close-up of wing of the citrus swallowtail, Papilio demodocus, with the letter 'C' drawn in scales. Photograph by Muhammad Mahdi Karim

The Butterfly Alphabet is a photographic artwork by the Norwegian naturalist Kjell Bloch Sandved.

Sandved worked at the Smithsonian's National Museum of Natural History in Washington, D.C., and came up with the idea with Barbara Bedette, a paleontologist, of finding all 26 letters of the Latin alphabet and the Arabic numerals 0 to 9 in the patterns on the wings of butterflies.

Sandved's photographic excursions led him to Brazil, Congo, Papua New Guinea and the Philippines. Searching for the forms took him over 24 years, but he finished the collection in 1975 and published it in the Smithsonian Magazine. It was republished by Scholastic, as a book in 1996, with accompanying snippets about butterfly species.
