= Barbara Bedette =

American paleontologist

Barbara A. Bedette (March 27, 1932 – February 23, 2006) was an American paleontologist. Her creation of 30,860 index cards for Cenozoic molluscs has become invaluable to the field of Atlantic and Gulf Coast Plains fossils studies.

== Early life ==
Barbara Audrey Bedette was born in Conneaut, Ohio, to Abraham and Margaret Bedette. She graduated from Bowling Green State University with a degree in geology. She was a member of the Gamma Theta Upsilon honour society of geography.

== Career ==
Moving to Washington, DC in 1954, Bedette began to work as an assistant to paleontologists including Harry S. Ladd and Wendell Woodring.

=== Paleontology ===
Bedette worked for the U.S. Geological Survey until her retirement in 1988. Her offices were in the National Museum of Natural History, where she collaborated with its scientists. She collated the Museum's vast collection and created a reference file of index cards for thousands of Cenozoic molluscs, an endeavour that proved invaluable to field researchers who could quickly ascertain if their discoveries had already been described before across the numerous journals of the discipline.

Bedette contributed to the Lexicon of Geologic Names of the United States. She counted the mollusc species and genera described by William Healey Dall, and calculated the percentage of species among the Pacific fauna.

Bedette received the Geological Survey's Scroll of Honor, and the Natural History Museum's Peer Recognition Community Award. A fossil mollusc from the Oxfordian period, Bathrotomaria bedetteae, was named posthumously in her honour.

Following her retirement from the Geological Survey, Bedette continued to work at the Natural History Museum, where she compiled descriptions of over 7000 fossils and living scallops. The task was almost finished before her death.

=== Butterfly alphabet ===
In 1960, Bedette met Kjell Sandved who had come to the Natural History Museum to research animal behaviour. He found boxes of butterflies stored at the Museum, and saw that one of them had the letter 'F' appear naturally as a pattern on its wing. Sandved and Bedette began a photographic investigation into such alphabet patterns in the world's butterflies. They established a small business, Butterfly Alphabet, Inc. The photographs Sandved took were later published in the Smithsonian Magazine in 1975,

== Later life and death ==
Barbara Bedette died of acute leukemia on February 23, 2006. She was interred in the Port Gibson cemetery, in Manchester, New York.
