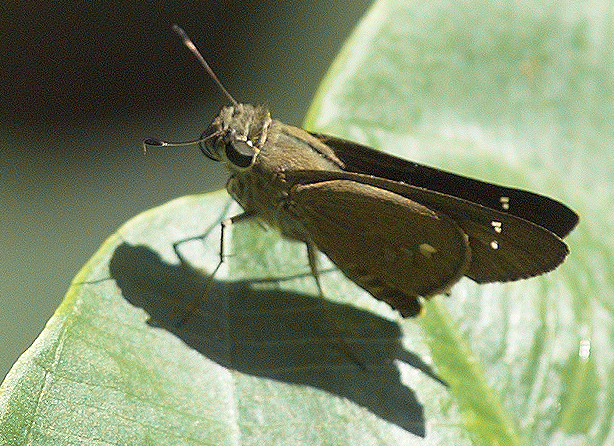
- Calpodes ethlius

Scientific classification
- Kingdom: Animalia
- Phylum: Arthropoda
- Clade: Pancrustacea
- Class: Insecta
- Order: Lepidoptera
- Family: Hesperiidae
- Subtribe: Calpodina
- Genus: Calpodes; Hübner, [1819]

= Calpodes =

Genus of butterflies

Calpodes is a genus of skipper butterflies in the family Hesperiidae.

== Species ==
Recognised species in the genus Calpodes include:

- Calpodes ethlius (Stoll, [1782]) - Brazilian skipper, larger canna leafroller or canna skipper
- Calpodes salius (Cramer, [1775])
