= Kjell Bloch Sandved =

Norwegian-American photographer (1922–2015)

- Born: October 20, 1922 in Strandebarm
- Died: December 20, 2015 (aged 93); Washington, DC
- Occupations: Author, lecturer and nature photographer
- Employer: National Museum of Natural History for the Smithsonian Institution
- Known for: Butterfly Alphabet
- Website: http://www.butterflyalphabet.com/

Kjell Bloch Sandved (October 20, 1922 – December 20, 2015) was a Norwegian born publisher, author, lecturer and nature photographer, most known for his Butterfly Alphabet which contains pictures of Butterfly Wings resembling all the 26 letters in the latin alphabet and the arabic numerals 0 to 9.

== Work in the United States ==
In 1960 he emigrated from Norway to United States, and from then he worked in National Museum of Natural History for the Smithsonian Institution as an author and lecturer. During his 32 year career there, Kjell Sandved has filmed penguins and seals in Antarctica, marine life and coral reefs in the Caribbean and Pacific, excavations of Early Bronze-Age Man at the Dead Sea, social behavior of orangutans in Kalimantan, and the world's largest flower, the Rafflesia Arnoldi, in Sumatra. He lectured with the Smithsonian Associates at schools and colleges around the United States on animal behavior and nature photography.

== Reception ==
Sandved's book The world of music is described by The Independent's Robert Fisk as "... a weighty heart attack of a book", and his book Leaves: The Formation, Characteristics, and Uses of Hundreds of Leaves Found in All Parts of the World is described by Tibor Fuchs as "Stunning photos and informative text about all kinds of leaves, including many that houseplant lovers have in their homes." In the City Room blog at New York Times written by the staff.

== Published work ==
Kjell B. Sandved has published two encyclopedias and co-edited nine books.

- Sandved, Kjell B.; Cassie, Brian (Author); Pyle, Robert Michael (Contributor) (5 May 2004). A World Of Butterflies. Bulfinch Press. pp. 432 pages. ISBN 978-0-8212-2893-7.
- Sandved, Kjell B. (March 1996). The Butterfly Alphabet. Scholastic. pp. 64 pages. ISBN 978-0-590-48003-1.
- Prance, Anne E.; Prance, Ghillean T. (Author); Sandved, Kjell Bloch (Photo) (1993). Bark: The Formation, Characteristics and Uses of Bark Around the World. Timber Press, Incorporated. pp. 176 pages. ISBN 978-0-88192-262-2.
- Prance, Ghillean Tolmie (1985). Leaves; The Formation, Characteristics and Uses of Hundreds of Leaves in all Parts of the World. Photos by Kjell B. Sandved. New York: Crown Publishers. pp. 244 pages. ISBN 978-0-517-55152-3.
- Sandved, Kjell B. (1982). Konstlexikon (Art lexikon) (in Swedish). Vol. I-II. A-L & M-Ö. Translated to Swedish by Tord Bæckström. Stockholm: Kulturhistoriska förlaget. pp. 2170 pages.
- Sandved, Kjell B.; Emsley, Michael G. (Author). Insect Magic. Penguin (Non-Classics). pp. 128 pages. ISBN 978-0-14-005125-4.
- Sandved, Kjell B. (March 1977). Butterflies. Harry N Abrams. pp. 176 pages. ISBN 978-0-8109-2064-4.
- Sandved, Kjell B. (1975). Butterfly magic. Pelham. pp. 128 pages. ISBN 978-0-7207-0839-4.
- Sandved, Kjell B. (1965). Kjell Bloch Sandved (ed.). The world of music, A treasury for listener and reader. Associate editors R. H. Hill and K. Claussen (First one-volume ed.). Farrington Street, London, E. C. 4: The Waverley Book Company Ltd. pp. 2239 pages.
- Sandved, Kjell B. (1963). The world of music. Abradale Press. pp. 1516 pages.
