= Chahuis =

Mexican name for edible beetles

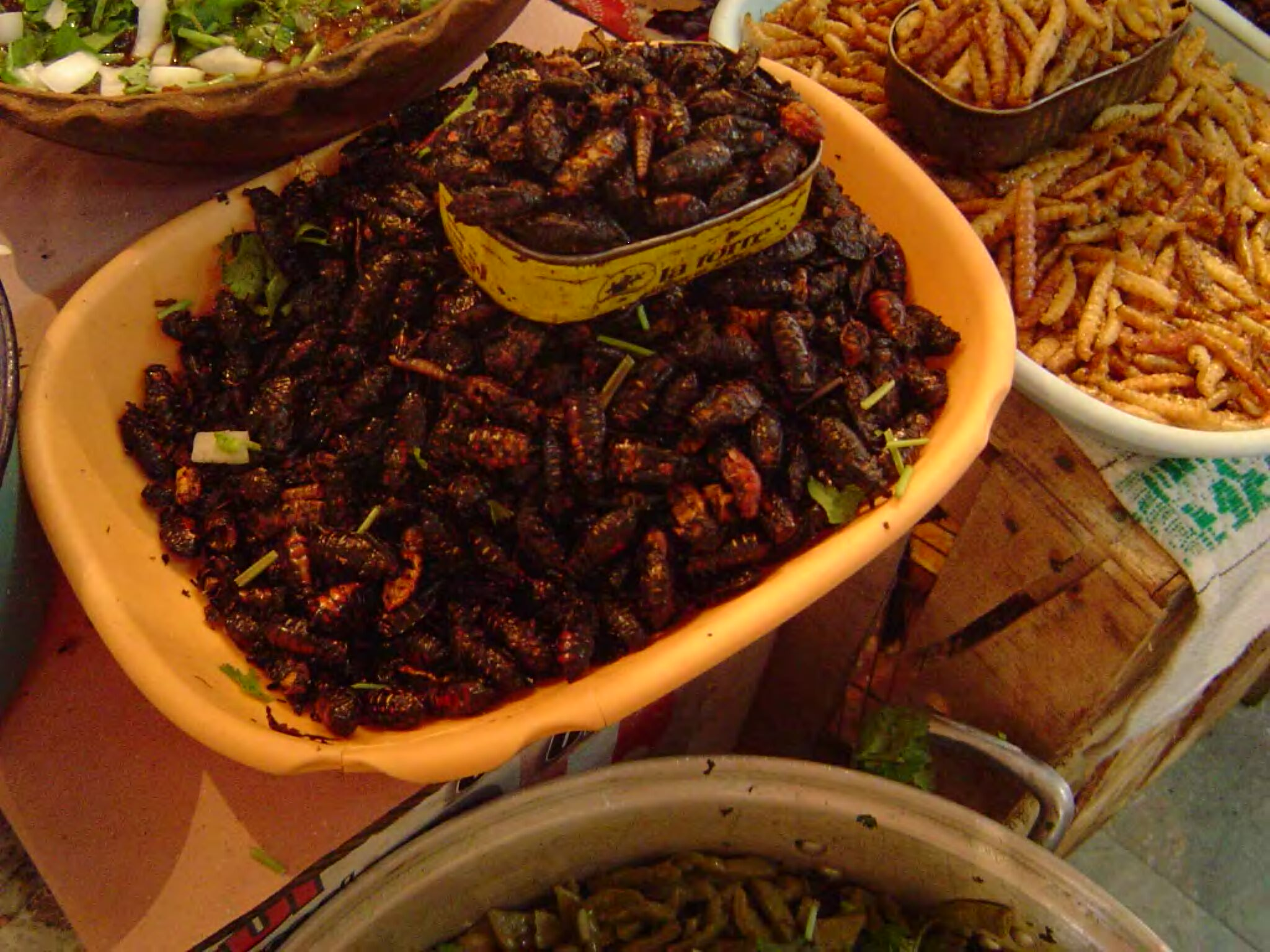
Chahuis and gusanos de maguey sold in the market of Tula de Allende, Mexico

Chahuis or xamoes are the common names given in Mexico to a variety of edible insects within the insect order Coleoptera (beetles).

Chahuis are consumed preferably in summer, in their last larval stage (2–3 weeks of life), since in their adult stage they have a bitter taste. They are consumed fried, roasted, stewed or in sauce, also tatemados al comal and served with salt and chili. In southern Mexico, they are eaten toasted on a comal or in a broth prepared with avocado leaf, epazote and ground corn.

== Distribution ==
There are 88 species of Coleoptera, primarily their larvae, that are eaten in Mexico as escarabajos comestibles. Particularly appreciated are the larvae of the following families: Cerambycidae, Scarabaeidae, and Passalidae. They are found in, and part of the cuisine of, the Mexican states of:

- Hidalgo
- Tabasco
- Guerrero
- Veracruz
- Mexico
- Oaxaca
- Puebla
- Distrito Federal
- Nayarit
- Chiapas
- Michoacán

== Preparation ==
Chahuis must be toasted well, otherwise they have a bitter flavor.

== See also ==
- Entomophagy – Practice of eating insects by organisms
- Entomophagy in humans – Practice of eating insects in human cultures
- Insects as food – Use of insects as food for humans
- List of edible insects by country
- Chapulines – Mexican dish of grasshoppers
- Escamol – Edible larvae and pupae of ants
- Jumiles – Stink bugs native to Mexico
- Maguey worm – Edible caterpillars that infest maguey
- Mezcal worm – Insect larva added for flavor to mezcal
