= Escamol =

Edible larvae and pupae of ants

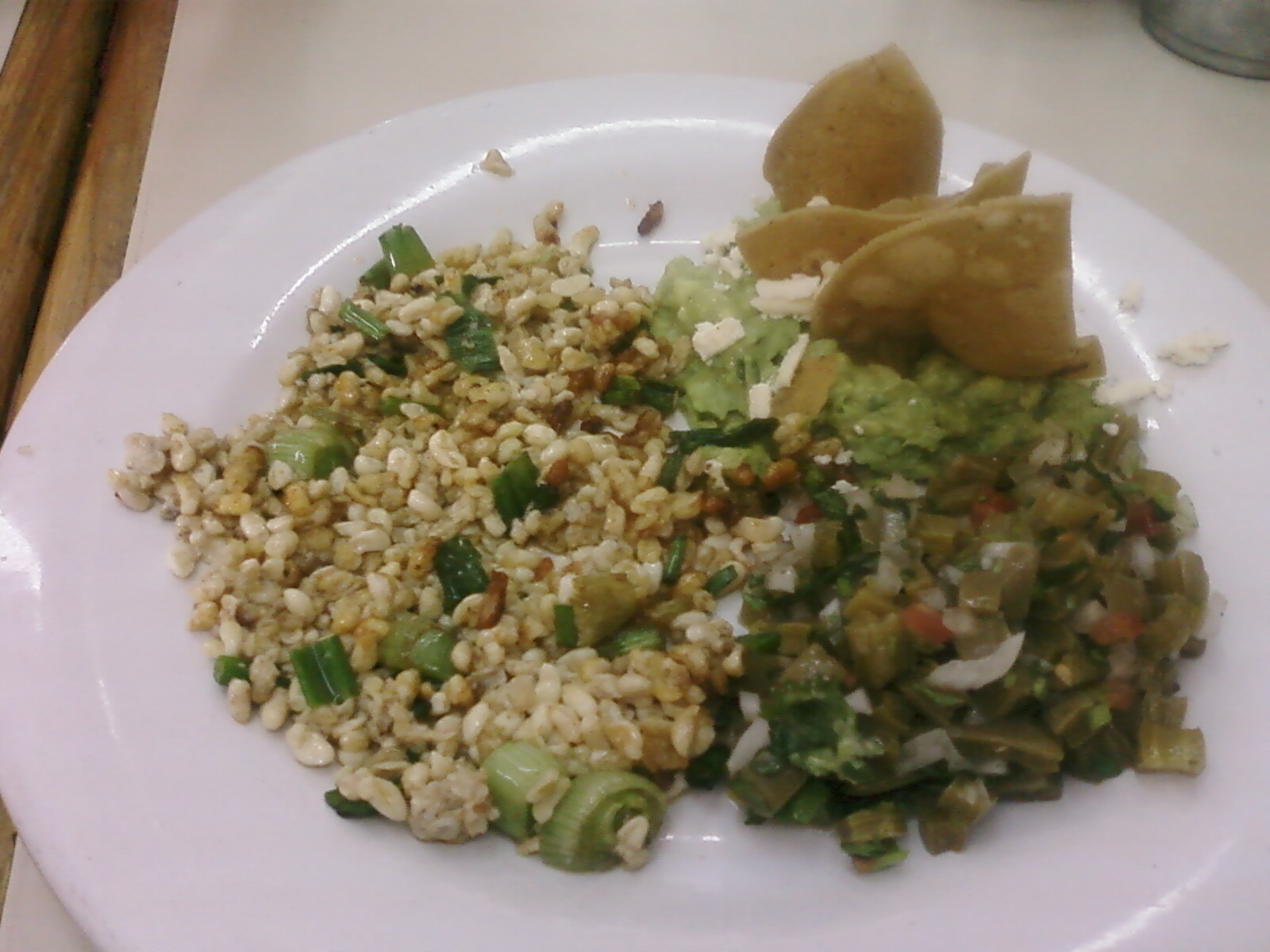
- Escamoles cooked in butter
- Alternative names: Mexican caviar
- Place of origin: Mexico
- Main ingredients: larvae and pupae of ants

Escamoles (Spanish: [eskaˈmoles]; Nahuatl languages: azcamolli, from azcatl 'ant' and molli 'puree'), known colloquially as Mexican caviar or insect caviar, are the edible larvae and pupae of ants of the species Liometopum apiculatum and L. occidentale var. luctuosum. They are most commonly consumed in Mexico City and surrounding areas. Escamoles have been consumed in Mexico since the age of the Aztecs. The taste is described as buttery and nutty, with a texture akin to that of cottage cheese.

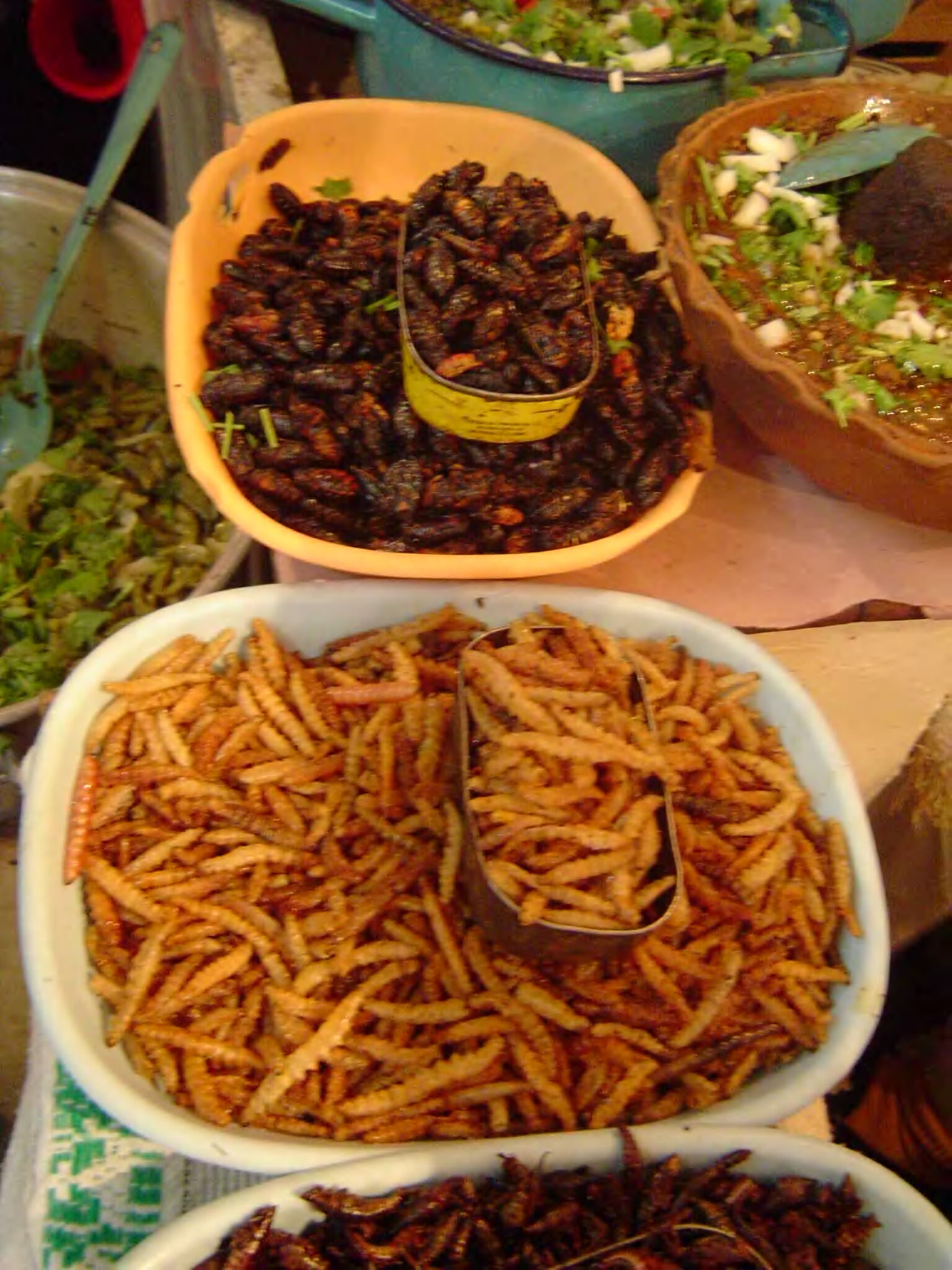

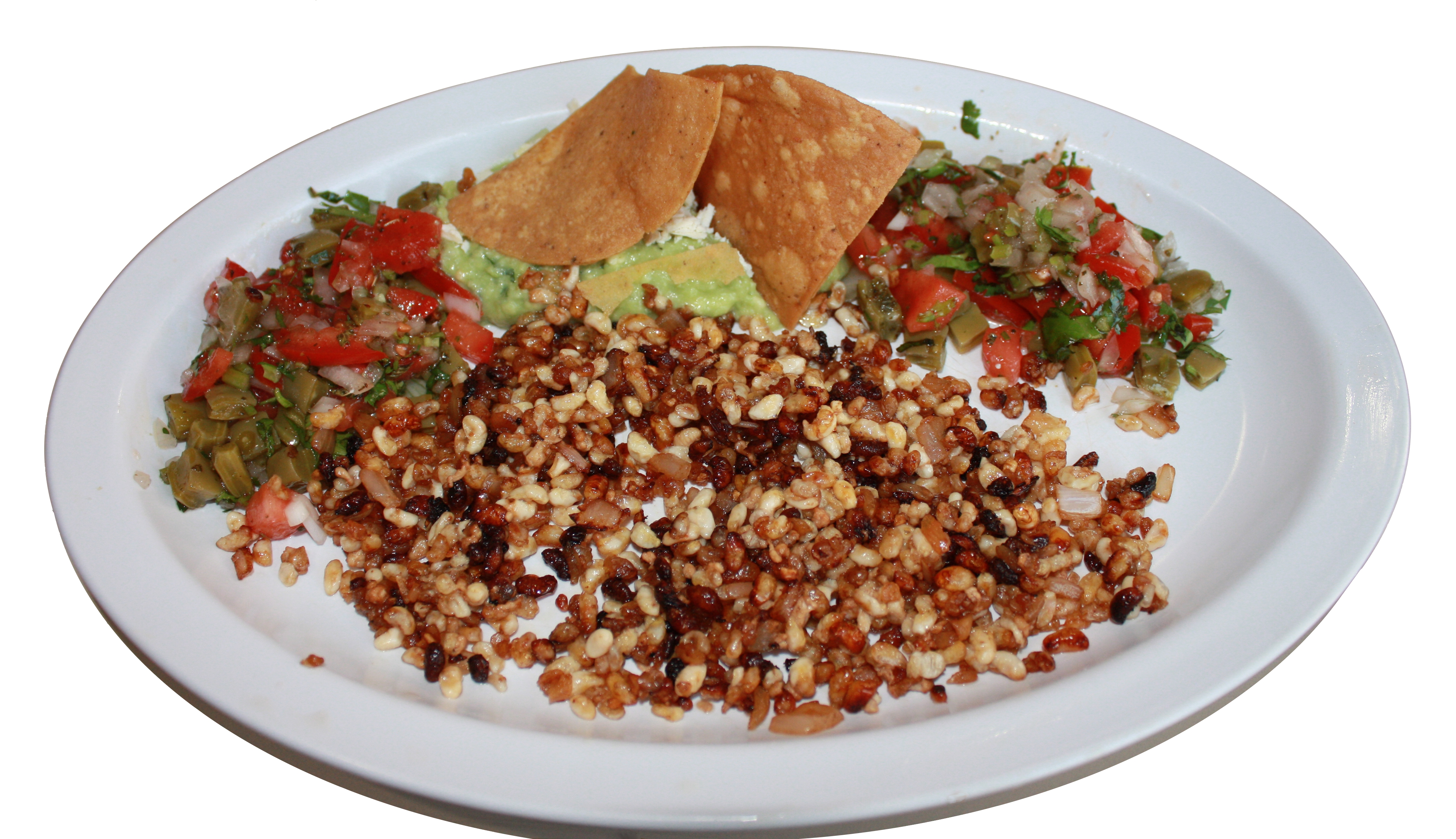
Escamoles al mojo de ajo

== See also ==
- Entomophagy – Practice of eating insects by organisms
- Entomophagy in humans – Practice of eating insects in human cultures
- Insects as food – Use of insects as food for humans
- List of edible insects by country
- Chahuis – Mexican name for edible beetles
- Chapulines – Mexican dish of grasshoppers
- Jumiles – Stink bugs native to Mexico
- Maguey worm – Edible caterpillars that infest maguey
- Mezcal worm – Insect larva added for flavor to mezcal
- List of delicacies
