= Jumiles =

Stink bugs native to Mexico

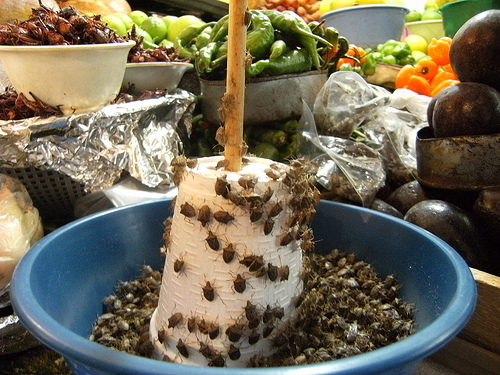
Live jumiles sold in a market in Taxco

Jumiles (Spanish: [xuˈmiles]; Nahuatl languages: Xomilli) are small stink bugs native to the Taxco region of the state of Guerrero in Mexico. Their diet includes the leaves of the encina (Quercus ilex) tree. Chumiles are a smaller, similar stink bug of the same region (southern Morelos and northern Guerrero). Any edible Hemiptera from the families Coreidae or Pentatomidae may be considered jumiles as well.

== Use as food ==
Jumiles are collected for their culinary value and may be roasted, fried, ground, or eaten raw. A salsa is prepared by combining fresh tomatoes, chiles, and onions with jumiles that have been mashed in a molcajete. The salsa is served with corn tortillas. The beginning of the jumil season on November 1 is the occasion of a large fiesta in Taxco. Fiesta-goers gather in the mountain park of Huisteco to collect jumiles and to crown a Jumil Queen. Jumiles are plentiful from November until February and become scarce after the first rains.

Jumiles have a cinnamon-like odor. They are considered an acquired taste due to their high iodine content, which imparts a bitter, medicinal flavor. Jumiles are also a good source of tryptophan and the vitamins riboflavin and niacin.

== See also ==
- Entomophagy – Practice of eating insects by organisms
- Entomophagy in humans – Practice of eating insects in human cultures
- Insects as food – Use of insects as food for humans
- List of edible insects by country
- Chahuis – Mexican name for edible beetles
- Chapulines – Mexican dish of grasshoppers
- Escamol – Edible larvae and pupae of ants
- Maguey worm – Edible caterpillars that infest maguey
- Mezcal worm – Insect larva added for flavor to mezcal
