= Maguey worm =

Edible caterpillars that infest maguey

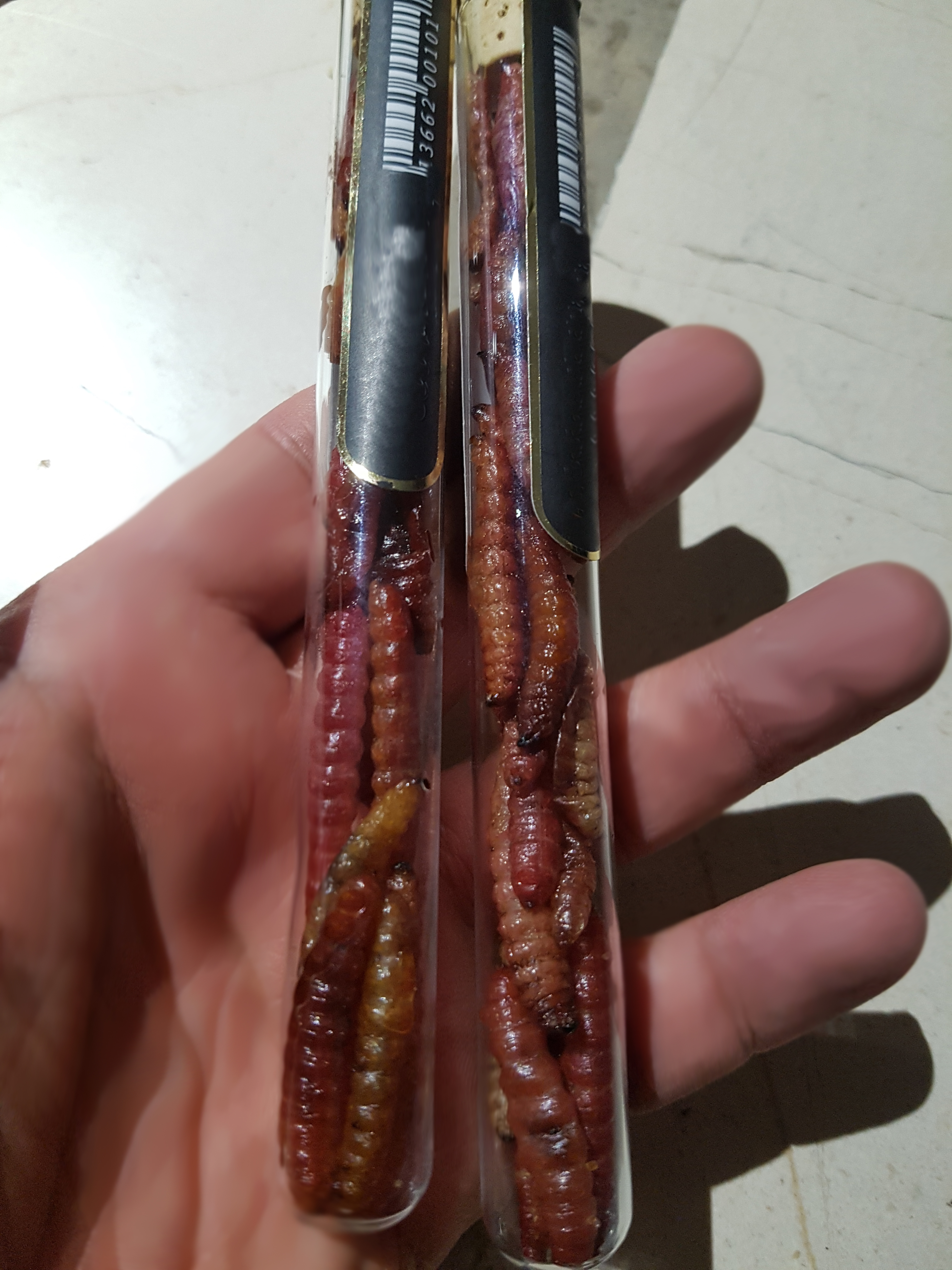
Edible dried maguey worms

Maguey worms (Spanish: gusanos de maguey, [ɡuˈsanos ðe maˈɣej]; chinicuiles [tʃiniˈkwiles]) are either of two species of edible caterpillars that infest maguey plants (Agave americana and Agave tequilana).

== White maguey worm ==
The white maguey worms, known as meocuiles, are caterpillars of a butterfly commonly named "tequila giant skipper," Aegiale hesperiaris.

Aegiale hesperiaris is found usually in regions of Central Mexico, on the leaves of Agavaceae plants, such as Agave tequilana and Agave americana (maguey). They are not found on cacti, as is often erroneously reported. Aegiale hesperiaris butterflies deposit their eggs at the heart of the leaves of agaves. The larvae then eat the flesh of the agave stems and roots, sometimes boring out the agave completely.

== Red maguey worm ==
The red maguey worms are known as chilocuiles, chinicuiles or tecoles, and are the larvae of the moth Comadia redtenbacheri. These infest the core and roots of the maguey plant, often in a collective mass. Along with agave snout weevil larvae (mezcal worm), red maguey worms are one of the types of gusanos found in bottles of mezcal liquor from the Mexican state of Oaxaca.

== In Mexican cuisine ==
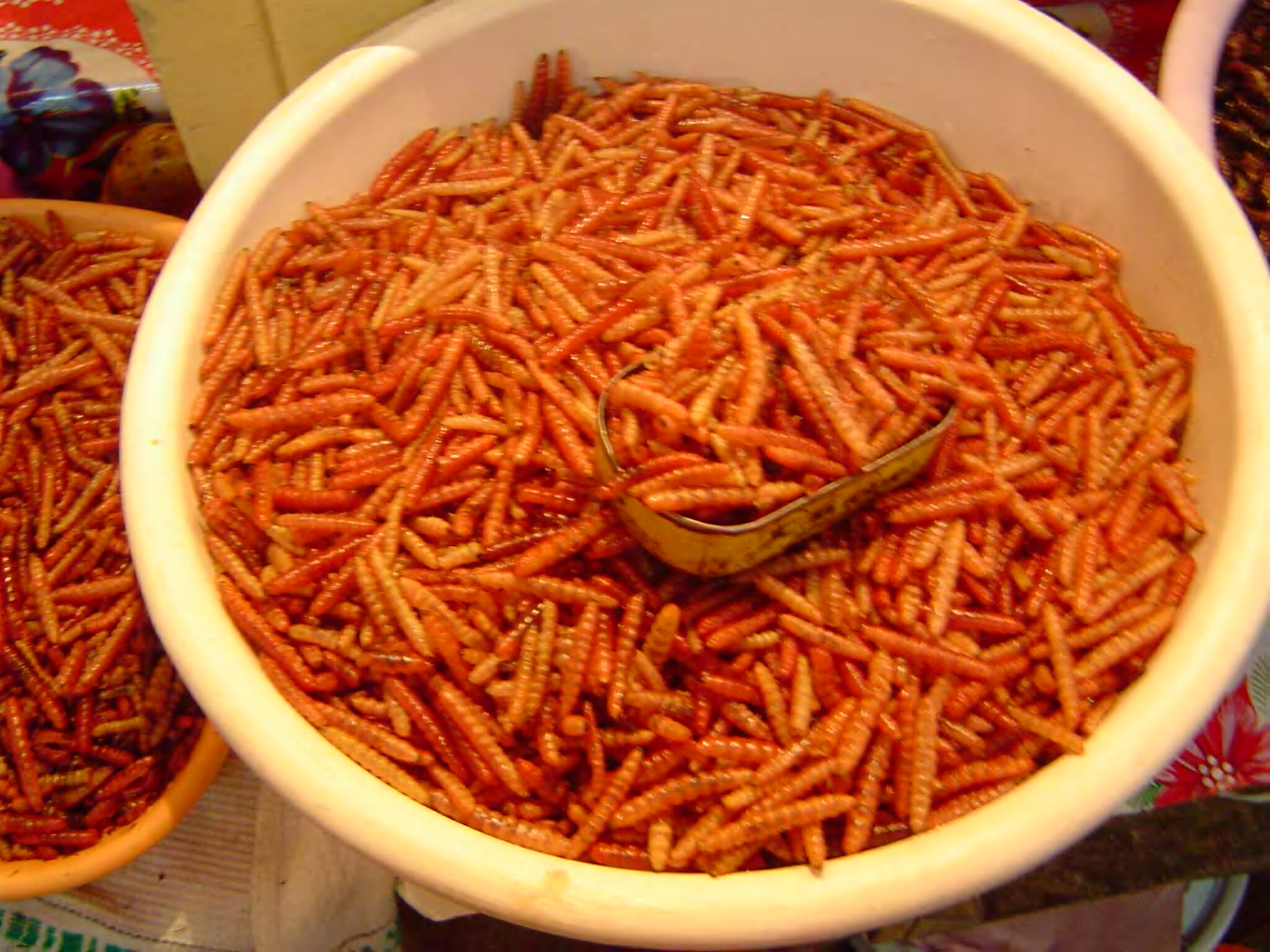
Chinicuiles for sale at a Mexican market

When fully mature, these caterpillars appear fleshy-red and can measure up to 65 mm (2.6 in). They are considered a highly nutritious delicacy in Mexican cuisine. One 100-gram serving contains over 650 calories, or the equivalent of two plates of rice. While they are sometimes eaten alive and raw, they are also considered delicious deep-fried or braised, seasoned with salt, lime, and a spicy sauce, and served in a tortilla.

== See also ==
- Entomophagy – Practice of eating insects by organisms
- Entomophagy in humans – Practice of eating insects in human cultures
- Insects as food – Use of insects as food for humans
- List of edible insects by country
- Chahuis – Mexican name for edible beetles
- Chapulines – Mexican dish of grasshoppers
- Escamol – Edible larvae and pupae of ants
- Jumiles – Common name for certain true bugs
- Mezcal worm – Insect larva added for flavor to mezcal
