= Chapulines =

Mexican dish of grasshoppers

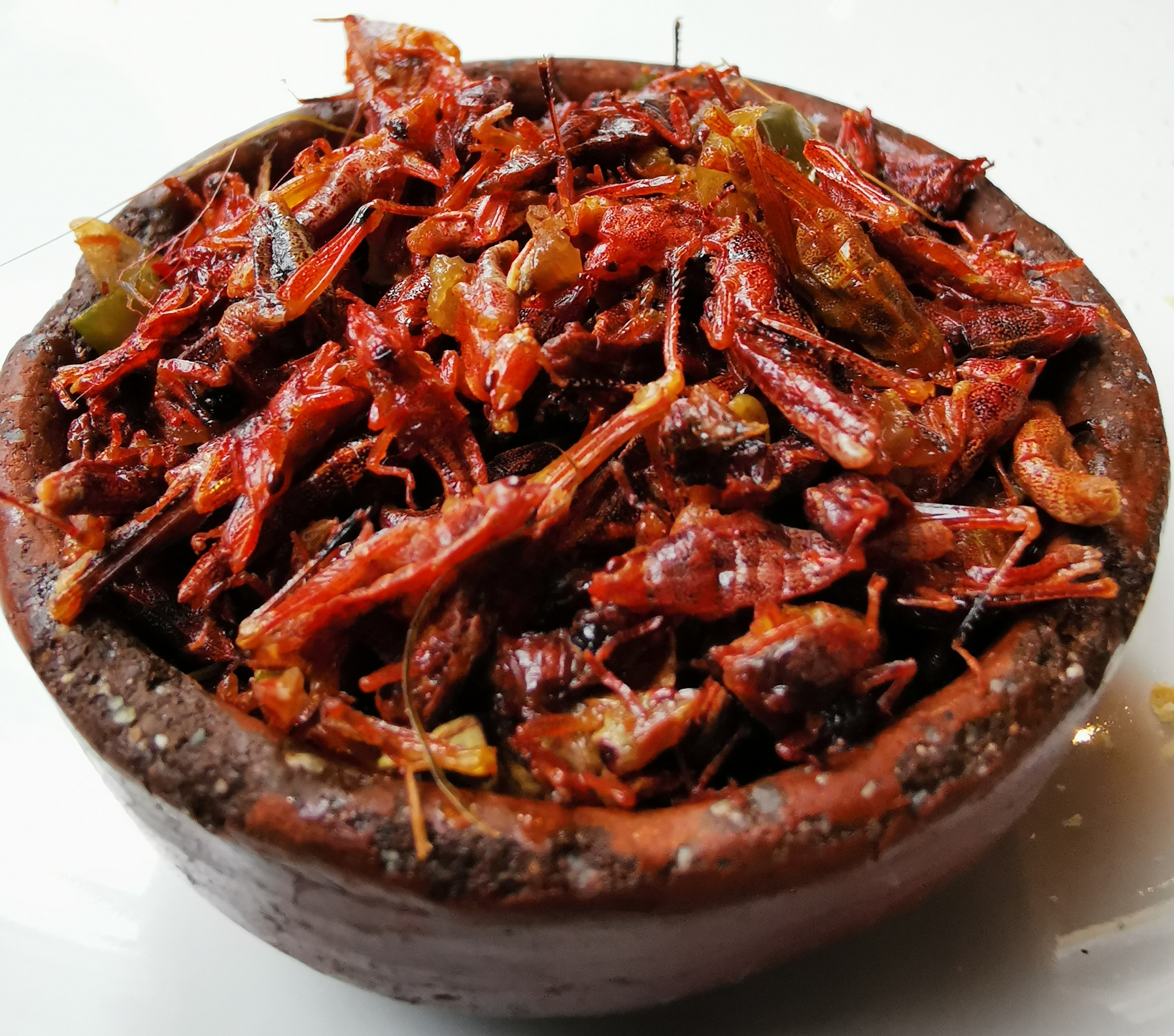
- A bowl of chapulines in Oaxaca City
- Place of origin: Mexico
- Main ingredients: Toasted grasshoppers

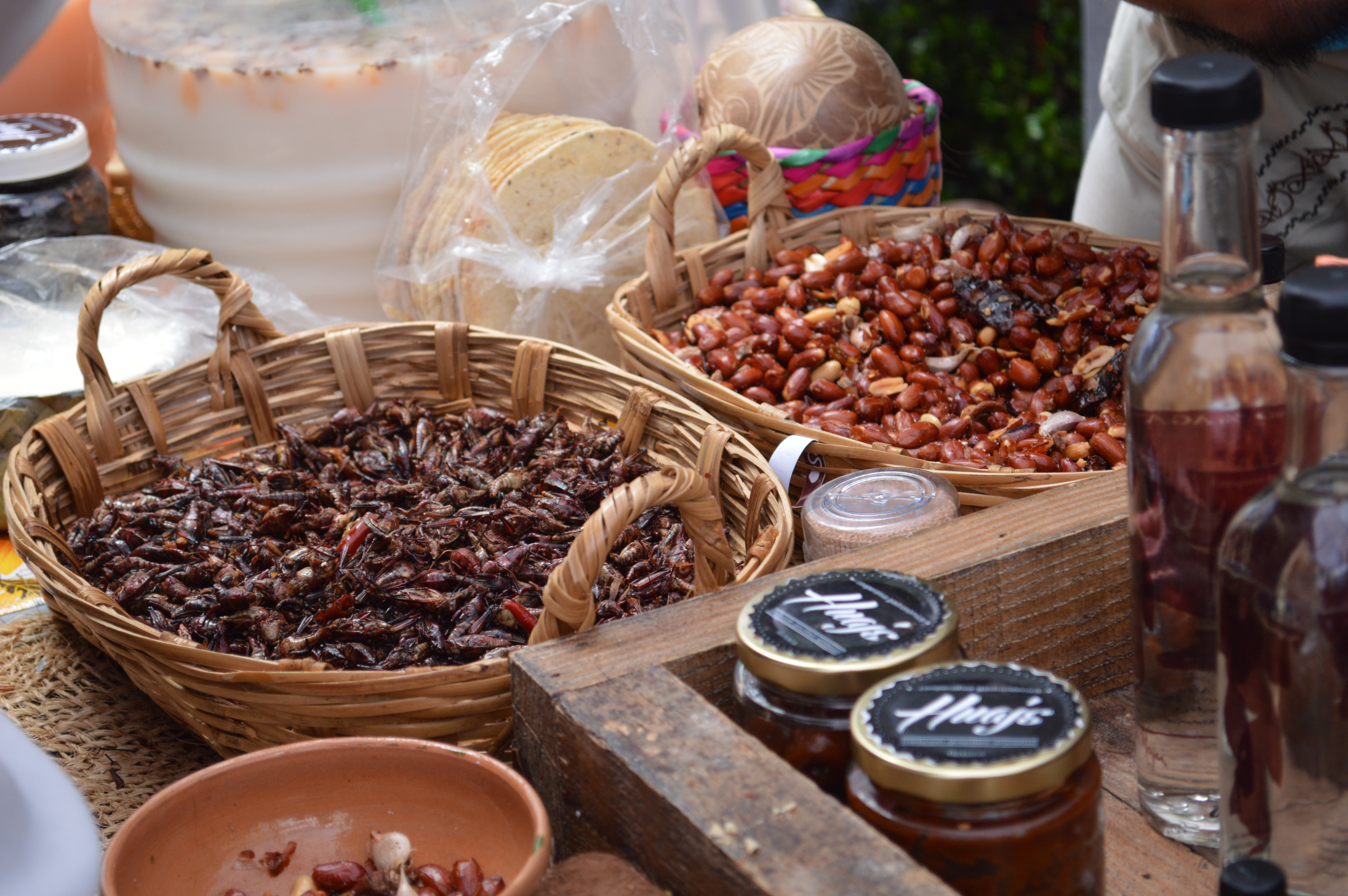
Chapulines and chili flavored peanuts at an artisanal food market in Colonia Roma, Mexico City

Chapulines, plural for chapulín (Spanish: [tʃapuˈlin]), are grasshoppers of the genus Sphenarium that are commonly eaten in certain areas of Mexico. The term is specific to Mexico and Central America, and derives from the Nahuatl word chapolin [t͡ʃaˈpolin] (singular) or chapolimeh [t͡ʃapoˈlimeʔ] (plural).

They are collected only at certain times of year (from their hatching in early May through the late summer/early autumn). They are toasted on a comal. Often they are seasoned with garlic, lime juice, chilies and/or salt.

One of the regions of Mexico where chapulines are most widely consumed is Oaxaca, where they are sold as snacks at local sports events and are becoming revived among foodies. There is one reference to grasshoppers that are eaten in early records of the Spanish conquest, in early to mid-16th century.

Besides Oaxaca, chapulines are popular in areas surrounding Mexico City, such as Tepoztlán, Cuernavaca and Puebla. They may be eaten individually as a botana (snack) or as a filling, e.g. tlayuda filled with chapulines. The Seattle Mariners successfully introduced chapulines as a novelty snack in their 2017 home games.

== Health risks ==
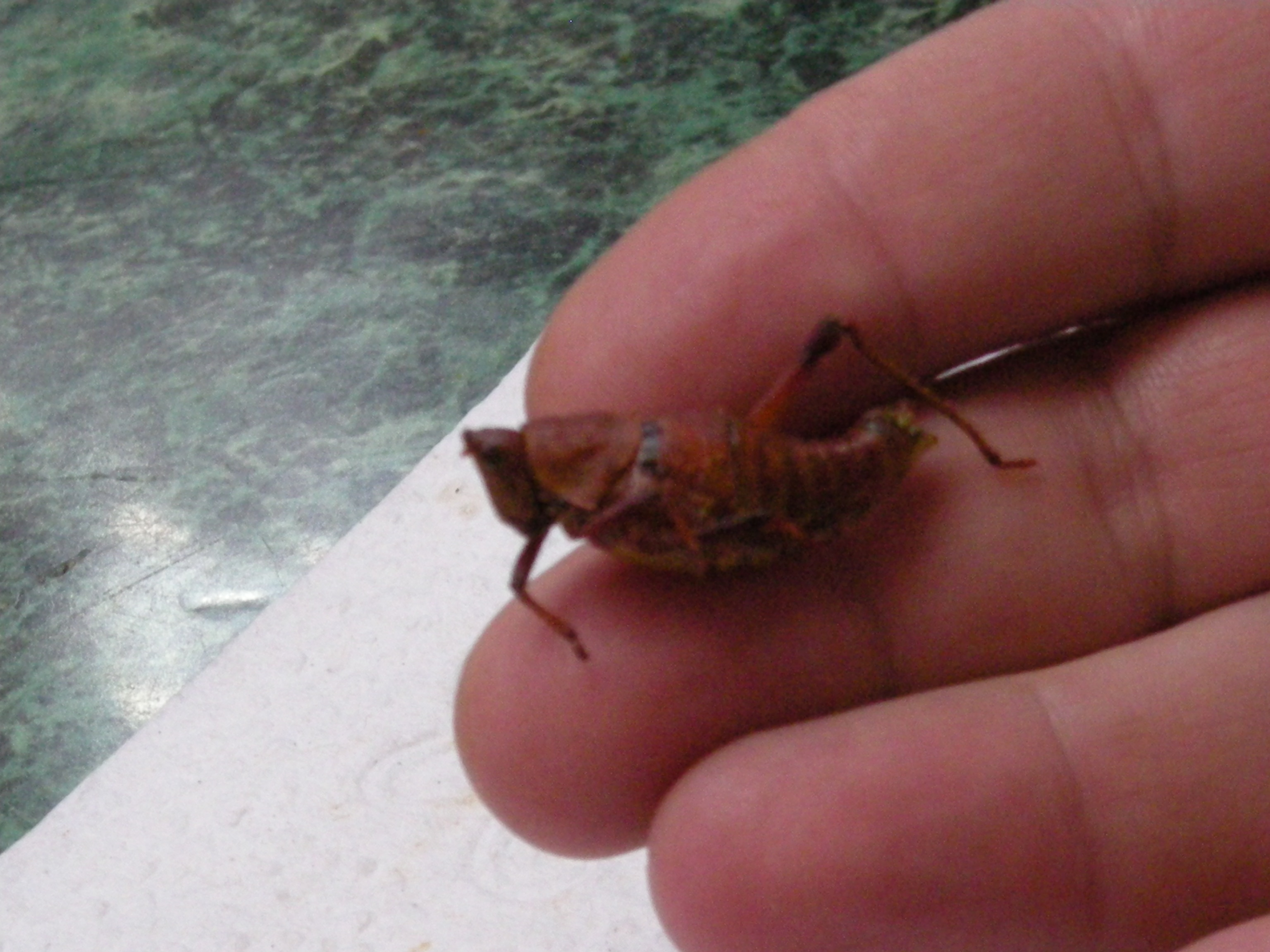
A fried chapulín

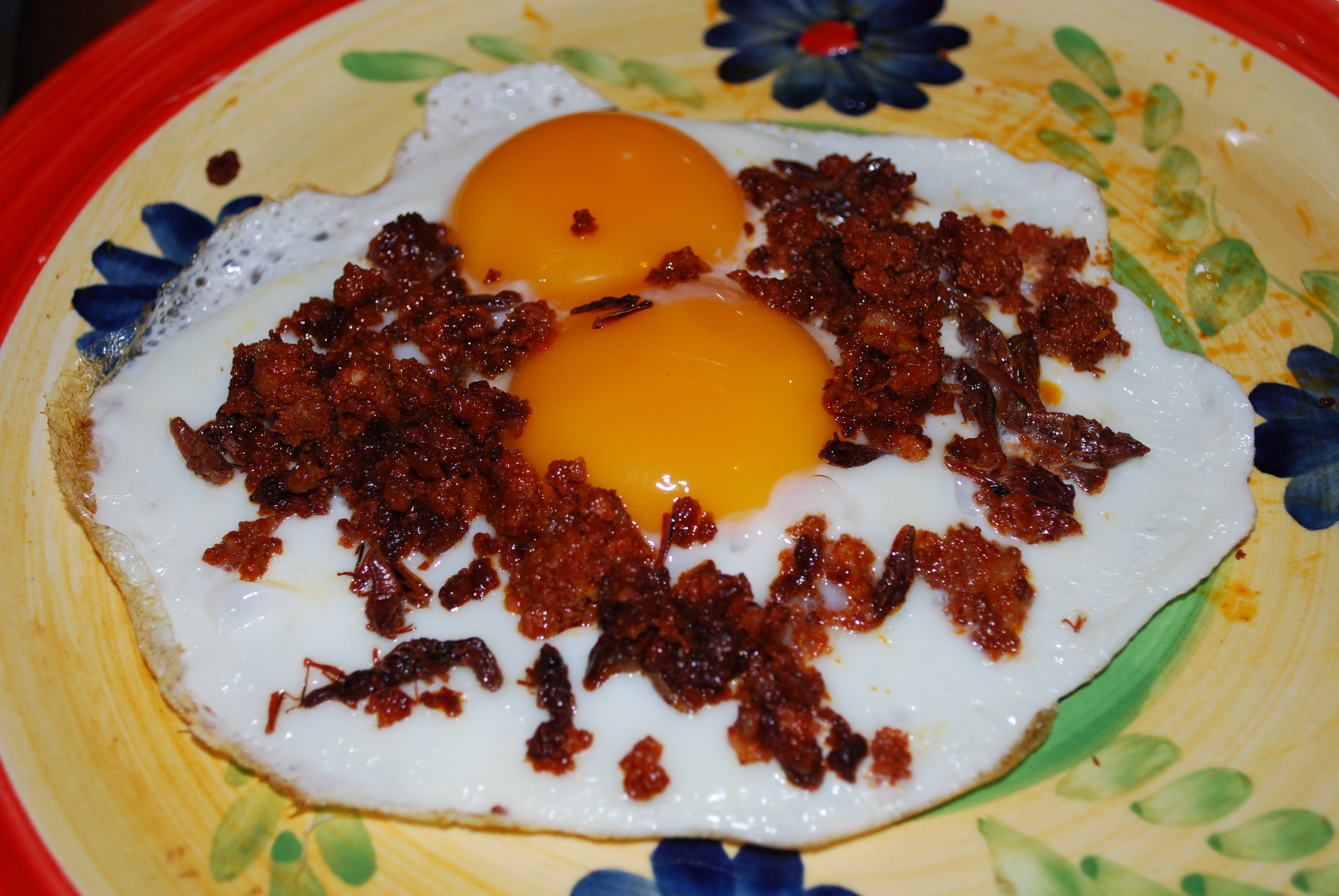
Fried egg with Oaxacan chorizo and chapulines

In 2007, several American media reported concerns over lead contamination in products imported from Zimatlán, a municipality in Oaxaca, including chapulines.

Edible insects are also known to affect people who have crustacean/shellfish allergies due to similar biochemistry because insects and crustaceans are related to each other, both being Tetraconata.

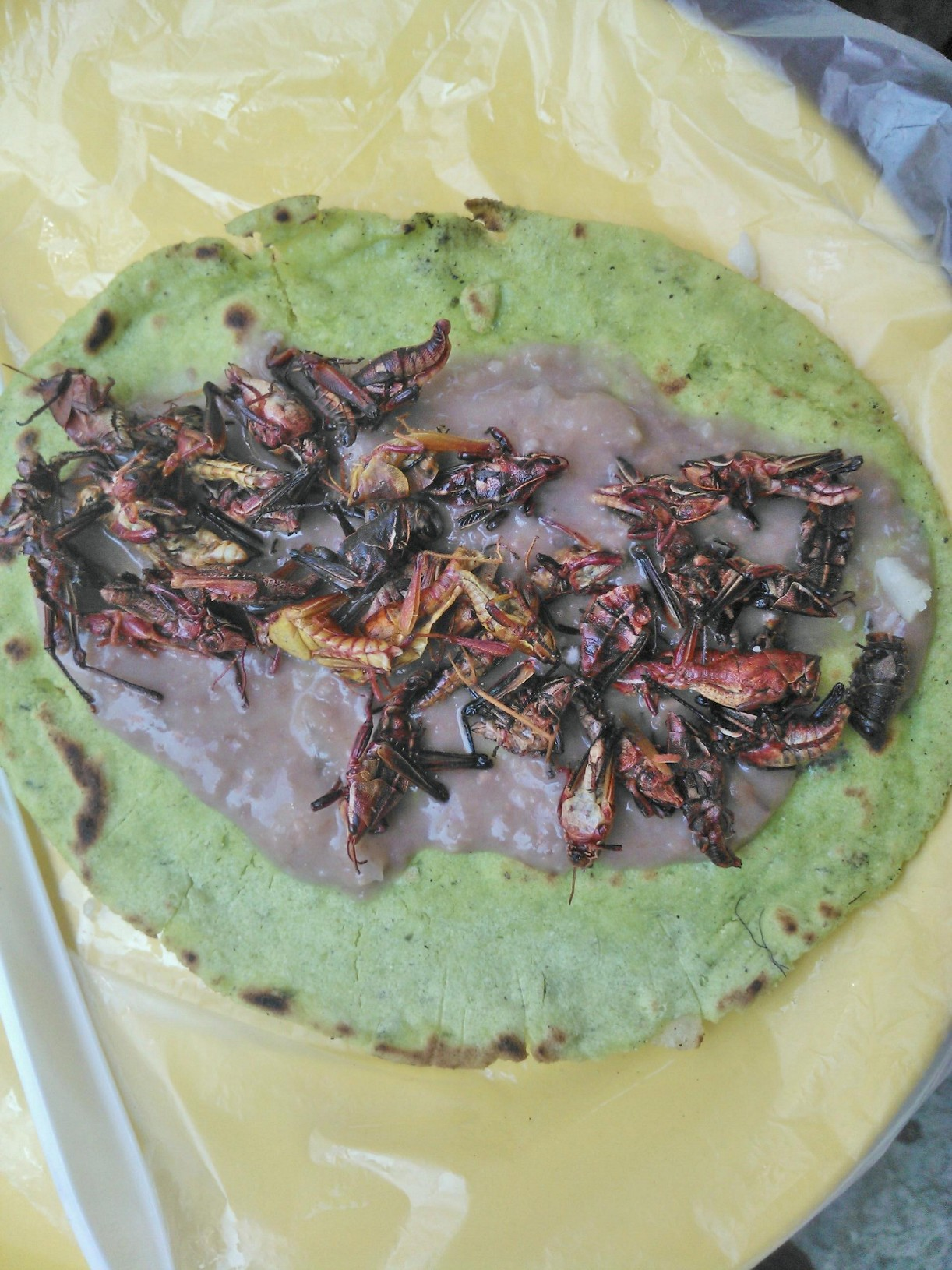
Taco made from nopal tortilla, fried beans and chapulines

Contaminated chapulines which were found for sale in California were also identified in samples from Zimatlán.

== See also ==
- Entomophagy – Practice of eating insects by organisms
- Entomophagy in humans – Practice of eating insects in human cultures
- Insects as food – Use of insects as food for humans
- List of edible insects by country
- Chahuis – Mexican name for edible beetles
- Escamol – Edible larvae and pupae of ants
- Jumiles – Stink bugs native to Mexico
- Maguey worm – Edible caterpillars that infest maguey
- Mezcal worm – Insect larva added for flavor to mezcal
- List of Mexican dishes
- List of Spanish words of Nahuatl origin
- Chapulín de la milpa – Species of grasshopper (Sphenarium purpurascens), a grasshopper species found in Mexico and Guatemala
