= Insects in medicine =

Uses of insects for medicinal purposes

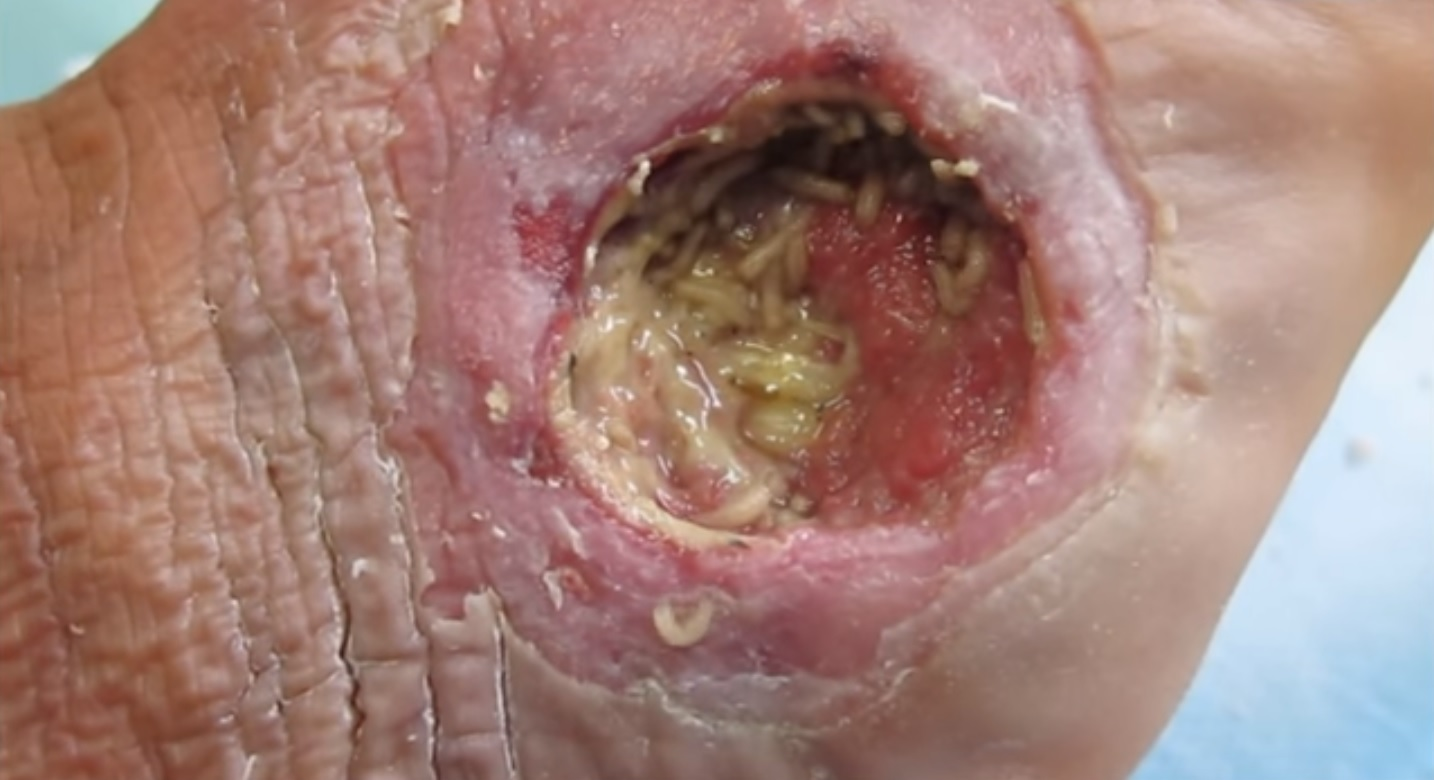
Maggot debridement therapy on a wound on a diabetic foot

Insects have long been used in medicine, both traditional and modern, sometimes with little evidence of their effectiveness.

== Traditional and alternative uses ==
The medicinal uses of insects and other arthropods worldwide have been reviewed by Meyer-Rochow, who provides examples of all major insect groups, spiders, worms and molluscs and discusses their potential as suppliers of bioactive components. Using insects (and spiders) to treat various maladies and injuries has a long tradition and, having stood the test of time, can be effective and provide results. However, sometimes folk-medicinal "logic" was based on the Doctrine of Signatures ("let likes be cured by likes") and had, if any at all, little more than a psychological effect. For example, to treat cases of constipation, dung beetles were prescribed; to slim down stick insects were thought to help; hairy tarantulas seemed the right treatment for hair loss and fat grubs resembling the swollen limb caused by the parasite Wuchereria bancrofti were expected to help the elephantiasis patient. An organism bearing parts that resemble human body parts, animals, or other objects, was thought to have useful relevance to those parts, animals or objects. So, for example, the femurs of grasshoppers, which were said to resemble the human liver, were used to treat liver ailments by the indigenous peoples of Mexico. This doctrine is common throughout traditional and alternative medicine, but is most prominent where medical traditions are broadly accepted, as in traditional Chinese medicine and Ayurveda, and less by community and family based medicine, as is more common in parts of Africa.

=== Traditional Chinese medicine ===
Traditional Chinese medicine includes the use of herbal medicine, acupuncture, massage, exercise, and dietary therapy. It is a typical component of modern medical care throughout East Asia and in some parts of Southeast Asia (such as Thailand). Insects are very commonly incorporated as part of the herbal medicine component of traditional Chinese medicine, and their medical properties and applications are broadly accepted and agreed upon. Some brief examples follow:

The Chinese Black Mountain Ant, Polyrhachis vicina, is supposed to act as a cure all and is widely used, especially by the elderly. It is said to prolong life, to have anti-aging properties, to replenish Qi, and to increase virility and fertility. Recent interest in the ants' medicinal qualities has led to researchers to study the extract's potential to serve as an anti-inflammatory cancer-fighting agent. Chinese Black Mountain Ant extract is typically consumed mixed with wine.

=== India and Ayurveda ===
Ayurveda is ancient traditional Indian treatment almost universally incorporated alongside Western medicine as a typical component of medical treatment in India. Although Ayurvedic medicine is often effective, doses can be inconsistent, and may sometimes be contaminated with toxic heavy metals. Some brief examples to follow:

Termite is said to cure a variety of diseases, both specific and vague. Typically the mound or a portion of the mound is dug up and the termites and the architectural components of the mound are together ground into a paste which is then applied topically to the affected areas or, more rarely, mixed with water and consumed. This treatment was said to cure ulcers, rheumatic diseases, and anemia. It was also suggested to be a general pain reliever and health improver.

The Jatropha Leaf Miner, a lepidopteran which feeds preferentially on Jatropha, is an example of a major insect agricultural pest which is also a medicinal remedy. The larvae, which are also the form of the insect with the greatest economic impact on agriculture, are harvested, boiled, and mashed into a paste which is administered topically and is said to induce lactation, reduce fever, and soothe gastrointestinal tracts.

=== Africa ===
Unlike China and India, the traditional insect medicine of Africa is extremely variable. It is largely regional, with few, if any, major agreements on which insects are useful as treatments for which ailments. Most insect medicinal treatments are passed on through communities and families, rather than being taught in university settings, as Traditional Chinese Medicine and Ayurveda sometimes are; furthermore, most traditional medicine practices necessitate a person in a "healer" role. Some brief examples to follow:

Grasshopper is both commonly eaten as a delicacy and an excellent source of protein and is consumed for medicinal purposes. These insects are typically collected, dried in the sun, and then ground into a powder. The powder can then be turned into a paste when mixed with water and ash and applied to the forehead to alleviate the pain of violent headaches. Additionally, the headaches themselves can be prevented by a "healer" inserting the paste under the skin at the nape of the affected person's neck.

Termites are also used in parts of Africa much like they are in India. Parts of the mound are dug up, boiled, and turned into a paste, which can then be applied to external wounds to prevent infection or consumed to treat internal hemorrhages. termites are used not only as a form of medicine, but also as a medical device. If a "healer" wants to insert a medicine subcutaneously, they will often spread that medicine on the skin of the patient, and then agitate a termite and place the insect on the skin of the patient. When the termite bites, its mandibles effectively serve as an injection device.

=== Historical Use of Insects in Medicine ===
The medicinal application of insects dates back to ancient civilizations. The Smithsonian Institution has documented historical uses of insects such as the utilization of bee venom therapy in Egyptian medicine for treating arthritis and joint pain. Ancient Greek and Roman physicians, including Galen, recorded the use of insects like cantharidin from blister beetles for dermatological conditions. In medieval Europe powdered insects were included in remedies for various ailments including infections and respiratory disorders.

=== Americas ===
The Americas were more highly influenced by the Doctrine of Signatures than China, India, or Africa, most likely because of their colonial history with Europe. The majority of insect use in medicine is associated with Central America and parts of South America, rather than North America, and most of it is based on the medical techniques of indigenous peoples. Currently, insect medicine is practiced much more rarely than in China, India, or Africa, though it is still relatively common in rural areas with large indigenous populations. Some examples to follow:

Chapulines, or grasshoppers, are commonly consumed as a toasted regional dish in some parts of Mexico, but they are also used medicinally. They are said to serve as diuretic to treat kidney diseases, to reduce swelling, and to relieve the pain of intestinal disorders when they are consumed. However, there are some risks associated with consuming chapulines, as they are known to harbor nematodes which may be transmitted to humans upon consumption.

Much like the termites of Africa, ants were sometimes used as medicinal devices by the indigenous peoples of Central America. The soldier cast of the Army ant would be collected and used as living sutures by Mayans. This involved agitating an ant and holding its mandibles up to the wound edges; when it bit down, the thorax and abdomen were removed, leaving the head holding the wound together. The ant's salivary gland secretions were reputed to have antibiotic properties. The venom of the Red harvester ant was used to treat rheumatism, arthritis, and poliomyelitis via the immunological reaction produced by its sting. This technique, in which ants are allowed to sting affected areas in a controlled manner, is still used in some arid rural areas of Mexico.

The silkworm, Bombyx mori, was also commonly consumed both as a regional food and for medicinal purposes in Central America after it was brought to the New World by the Spanish and Portuguese. Only the immatures are consumed. Boiled pupae were eaten to treat apoplexy, aphasy, bronchitis, pneumonia, convulsions, hemorrhages, and frequent urination. The excrement produced by the larvae is also eaten to improve circulation and alleviate the symptoms of cholera (intense vomiting and diarrhea).

=== Honey bee products ===
Honey bee products are used medicinally across Asia, Europe, Africa, Australia, and the Americas, despite the fact that the honey bee was not introduced to the Americas until the colonization by Spain and Portugal. They are by far the most common medical insect product, both historically and currently.

Honey is the most frequently referenced medical bee material. It can be applied to skin to treat excessive scar tissue, rashes, and burns, and can be applied as a poultice to eyes to treat infection. It is also consumed for digestive problems and as a general health restorative, and can be heated and consumed to treat head colds, cough, throat infections, laryngitis, tuberculosis, and lung diseases.

Additionally, apitoxin, or honey bee venom, can be applied via direct stings to relieve arthritis, rheumatism, polyneuritis, and asthma. Propolis, a resinous, waxy mixture collected by honeybees and used as a hive insulator and sealant, is often consumed by menopausal women because of its high hormone content, and it is said to have antibiotic, anesthetic, and anti-inflammatory properties. Royal jelly is used to treat anemia, gastrointestinal ulcers, arteriosclerosis, hypo- and hypertension, and inhibition of sexual libido. Finally Bee bread, or bee pollen, is eaten as a generally health restorative, and is said to help treat both internal and external infections. All of these honey bee products are regularly produced and sold, especially online and in health food stores, though none are yet approved by the FDA.

== Modern scientific uses ==
Though insects were widely used throughout history for medical treatment on nearly every continent, relatively little medical entomological research has been conducted since the revolutionary advent of antibiotics. Heavy reliance on antibiotics, coupled with discomfort with insects in Western culture limited the field of insect pharmacology until the rise of antibiotic resistant infections sparked pharmaceutical research to explore new resources. Arthropods represent a rich and largely unexplored source of new medicinal compounds.

=== Maggot therapy ===
Maggot therapy is the intentional introduction of live, disinfected blow fly larvae (maggots) into soft tissue wounds to selectively clean out the necrotic tissue. This helps to prevent infection; it also speeds healing of chronically infected wounds and ulcers. Military surgeons since classical antiquity noticed that wounds which had been left untreated for several days, and which had become infested with maggots, healed better than wounds not so infested. Maggots secrete several chemicals that kill microbes, including allantoin, urea, phenylacetic acid, phenylacetaldehyde, calcium carbonate, proteolytic enzymes, and many others.

Maggots were used for wound healing by the Maya and by indigenous Australians. More recently, they were used in Renaissance Europe, in the Napoleonic Wars, the American Civil War, and in the First and Second World Wars. It continues to be used in military medicine.

=== Apitherapy ===
Apitherapy is the medical use of honeybee products such as honey, pollen, bee bread, propolis, royal jelly and bee venom. One of the major peptides in bee venom, called Melittin, has the potential to treat inflammation in people who have Rheumatoid arthritis or Multiple sclerosis. Melittin blocks the expression of inflammatory genes, thus reducing swelling and pain. It is administered by direct insect sting, or intramuscular injections. Bee products demonstrate a wide array of antimicrobial factors and in laboratory studies and have been shown to kill antibiotic resistant bacteria, pancreatic cancer cells, and many other infectious microbes.

=== Biochemical and Pharmaceutical Properties ===
Research has demonstrated that various insect derived compounds exhibit antimicrobial, anti inflammatory, and wound healing properties. Maggot therapy, for instance, has been extensively studied for its ability to clean necrotic tissue and promote wound healing. According to studies published in PubMed and the NCBI Bookshelf, maggots of the Lucilia sericata species secrete enzymes that break down dead tissue while releasing antimicrobial peptides effective against antibiotic resistant bacteria. Also certain insect derived compounds, such as chitosan from insect exoskeletons, have shown promise in drug delivery systems and wound dressings due to their biocompatibility and hemostatic properties.

=== Blister beetle and Spanish fly ===
Spanish fly is an emerald-green beetle, Lytta vesicatoria, in the blister beetle family (Meloidae). It and other such species were used in preparations offered by traditional apothecaries. The insect is the source of the terpenoid cantharidin, a toxic blistering agent once used as an aphrodisiac.

=== Entomotherapy: Nutritional and Medicinal Benefits ===
Insects have played a significant role in traditional and modern medicine across various cultures. The Food and Agriculture Organization (FAO) Edible Insects Report highlights the nutritional and therapeutic potential of insects, they have high protein content, essential fatty acids, and bioactive compounds. Some traditional healing practices incorporate insects as remedies for inflammatory conditions, infections, and gastrointestinal disorders. In China and other parts of Asia silkworm derived compounds have been used in traditional medicine to treat high blood pressure and atherosclerosis. Similarly termites and grasshoppers are utilized in African medicine for their perceived immune boosting effects.

=== Ethnopharmacological Perspectives ===
The Journal of Ethnopharmacology provides extensive documentation of insect based treatments in indigenous medicine. Ethnopharmacological research has revealed that insects are integral to traditional healing systems in many cultures. In South America ant and wasp venoms are used in pain management and inflammation control. Also in India scorpions and centipedes have been incorporated into Ayurvedic medicine for treating neurological disorders. These case studies illustrate the cultural diversity in insect based medicine and underscore the potential for modern pharmacological applications.

=== Blood-feeding insects ===
Many blood-feeding insects like horseflies or mosquitoes inject multiple bioactive compounds into their prey. These insects have been used by practitioners of Eastern Medicine for hundreds of years to prevent blood clot formation or thrombosis. However, modern medical research has only recently begun to investigate the drug development potential of blood-feeding insect saliva. These compounds in the saliva of blood feeding insects are capable of increasing the ease of blood feeding by preventing coagulation of platelets around the wound and provide protection against the host's immune response. Currently, over 1280 different protein families have been associated with the saliva of blood feeding organisms.

=== Modern Applications and Research ===
Recent scientific advancements have led to a great interest in insect derived pharmaceuticals. Researchers are investigating the potential of insect peptides as alternatives to conventional antibiotics, given their effectiveness against drug resistant pathogens. Additionally bioengineering techniques are being explored to enhance the medicinal properties of insect compounds with applications in tissue regeneration, cancer therapy, and antimicrobial resistance management.
