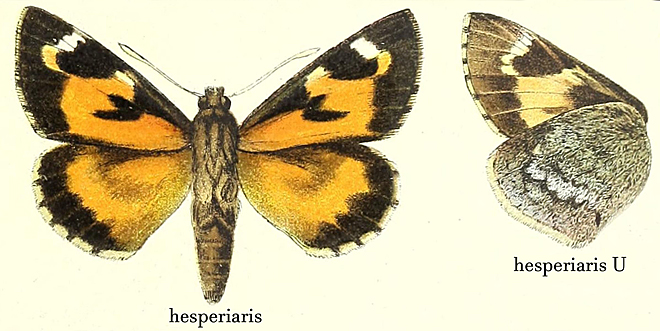

Scientific classification
- Kingdom: Animalia
- Phylum: Arthropoda
- Class: Insecta
- Order: Lepidoptera
- Family: Hesperiidae
- Subfamily: Hesperiinae
- Tribe: Megathymini
- Genus: Aegiale; C.Felder & R.Felder, 1860
- Species: A. hesperiaris

Binomial name
- Aegiale hesperiaris (Walker, 1856)

Synonyms
- List (Genus): Acentrocneme C.Felder & R.Felder, 1862; Teria P.Blásquez & I.Blásquez, 1870; Acentrocneme Scudder, 1875; (Species): Castnia hesperiaris Walker, 1856; Aegiale kollari C.Felder & R.Felder, 1860; Teria agavis P.Blásquez & I.Blásquez, 1865

= Aegiale hesperiaris =

Species of butterfly

Aegiale hesperiaris, commonly known as the tequila giant skipper, is a species of butterfly in the family Hesperiinae. It is the only species in the monotypic genus Aegiale. Its caterpillar is one of two varieties of edible "maguey worms" that infest maguey and Agave tequilana plants.

The white maguey worm, known as meocuiles, are caterpillars of this species.

It usually is found in regions of central Mexico, on the leaves of family Agavaceae plants, such as: Agave tequilana and Agave americana (maguey). They are not found on cacti, as is often erroneously reported. The butterflies deposit their eggs at the heart of the leaves of agaves. The larvae then eat the flesh of the agave stems and roots, sometimes boring out the agave completely.
