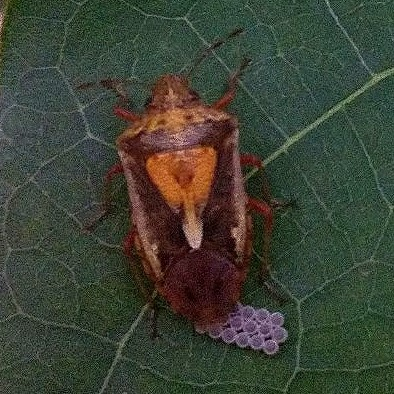
- Laying eggs

Scientific classification
- Kingdom: Animalia
- Phylum: Arthropoda
- Class: Insecta
- Order: Hemiptera
- Suborder: Heteroptera
- Family: Pentatomidae
- Genus: Udonga
- Species: U. montana

Binomial name
- Udonga montana (Distant, 1900)

Synonyms
- Ochrophora montana

= Udonga montana =

Species of true bug

Udonga montana is a species of Pentatomid bug found in parts of Asia. Large populations and aggregations are found during some years and in parts of northeastern India, their outbreaks are associated with the mass flowering of bamboo. They are traditionally collected and eaten in some parts of their range and in Mizoram they are known locally as thangnang and are of some economic value as food and for purported value in traditional cures.

The bug is about 13 mm long variable in colour with brown to yellow. The scutellum tends to be yellow. The corium, hind scutellum and pronotum are darker. The antenna are pale brown with the 4th and 5th segments being dark. The anterior angle of the pronotum has a short spine which may sometimes only show as a tubercle.

Population surges of Udonga montana have been reported from parts of the Karnataka Western Ghats during which time large aggregations occur on trees. In Mizoram, several local foods are made from thangnang, some by frying the insects in oil. An oily fluid is extracted the insects which has a high market value for use in traditional medicine.
