= Mezcal worm =

Insect larva added for flavor to mezcal

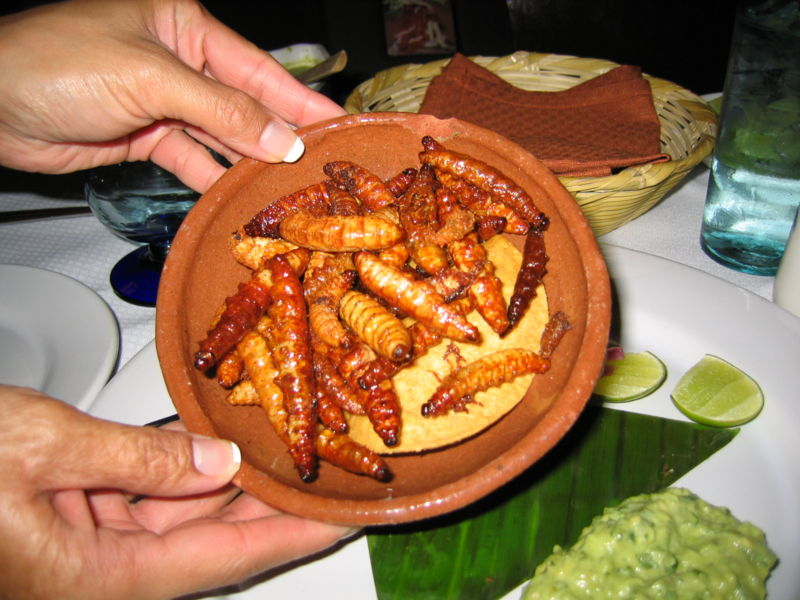
Mezcal worms

A mezcal worm is an insect larva found in some types of mezcal produced in Oaxaca, Mexico. The larva is a red maguey worm, the caterpillar of the Comadia redtenbacheri moth, usually called chinicuil or gusano rojo ("red worm"). The red worm is typically considered tastier than a white maguey worm.

Although the custom is relatively recent, larvae are used by several brands of mezcal to give flavor to the drink. In 1950, Jacobo Lozano Paez first introduced the practice of adding larvae to mezcal.

The other variety of "worm" in mezcal is the larva of a weevil known as picudo del agave, Scyphophorus acupunctatus, the agave snout weevil, that infests certain species of yucca and maguey. They are not related to edible maguey worms.

Picudo larvae may be roasted and eaten; they are a seasonal specialty of markets in southeastern Mexico.

== See also ==
- Entomophagy in humans – Practice of eating insects in human cultures
- Maguey worm – Edible caterpillars that infest maguey
- Insects as food
