= Entomophagy in humans =

Practice of eating insects in human cultures

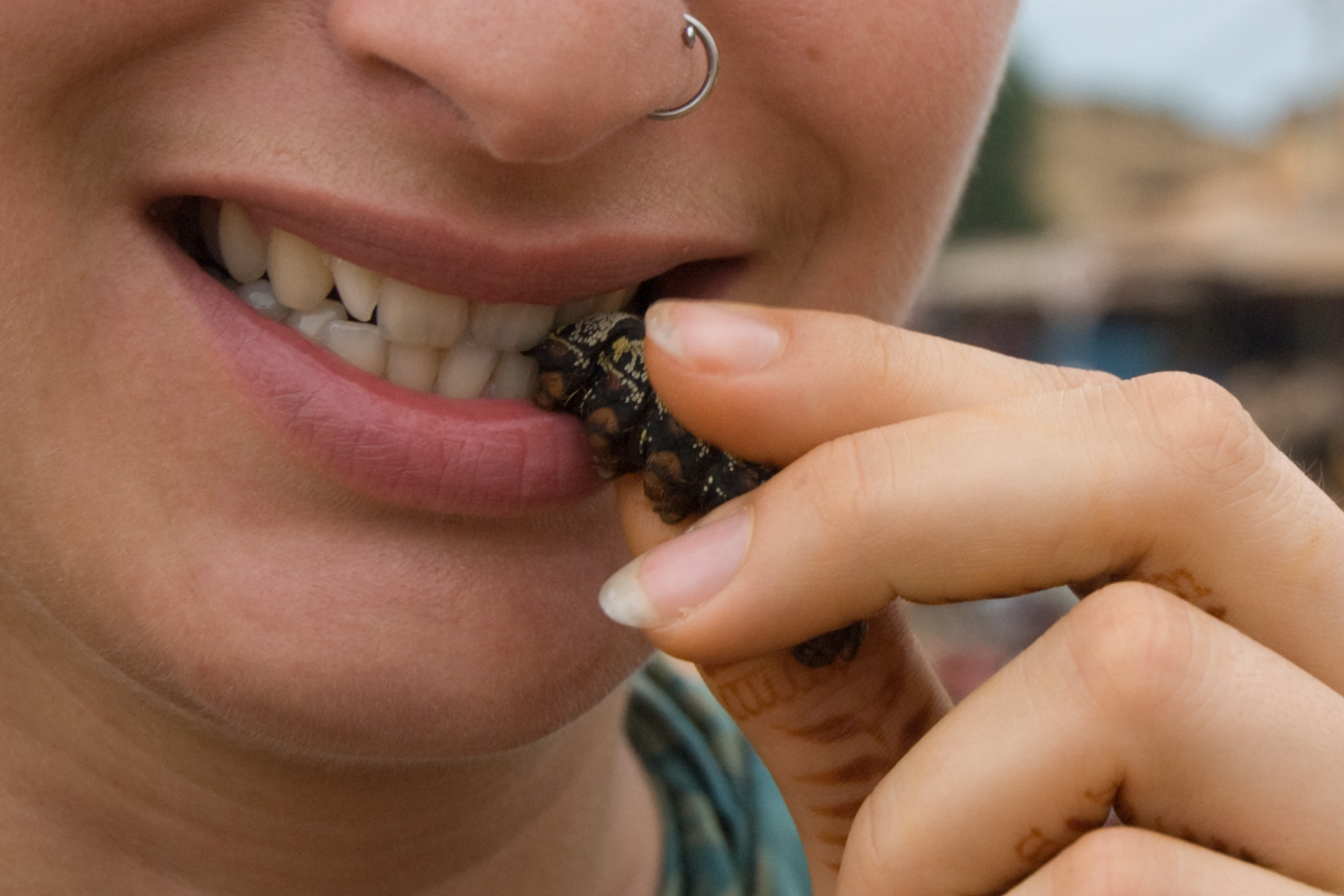
Human consumption of a moth caterpillar (genus Cirina, Saturniidae) in Burkina Faso

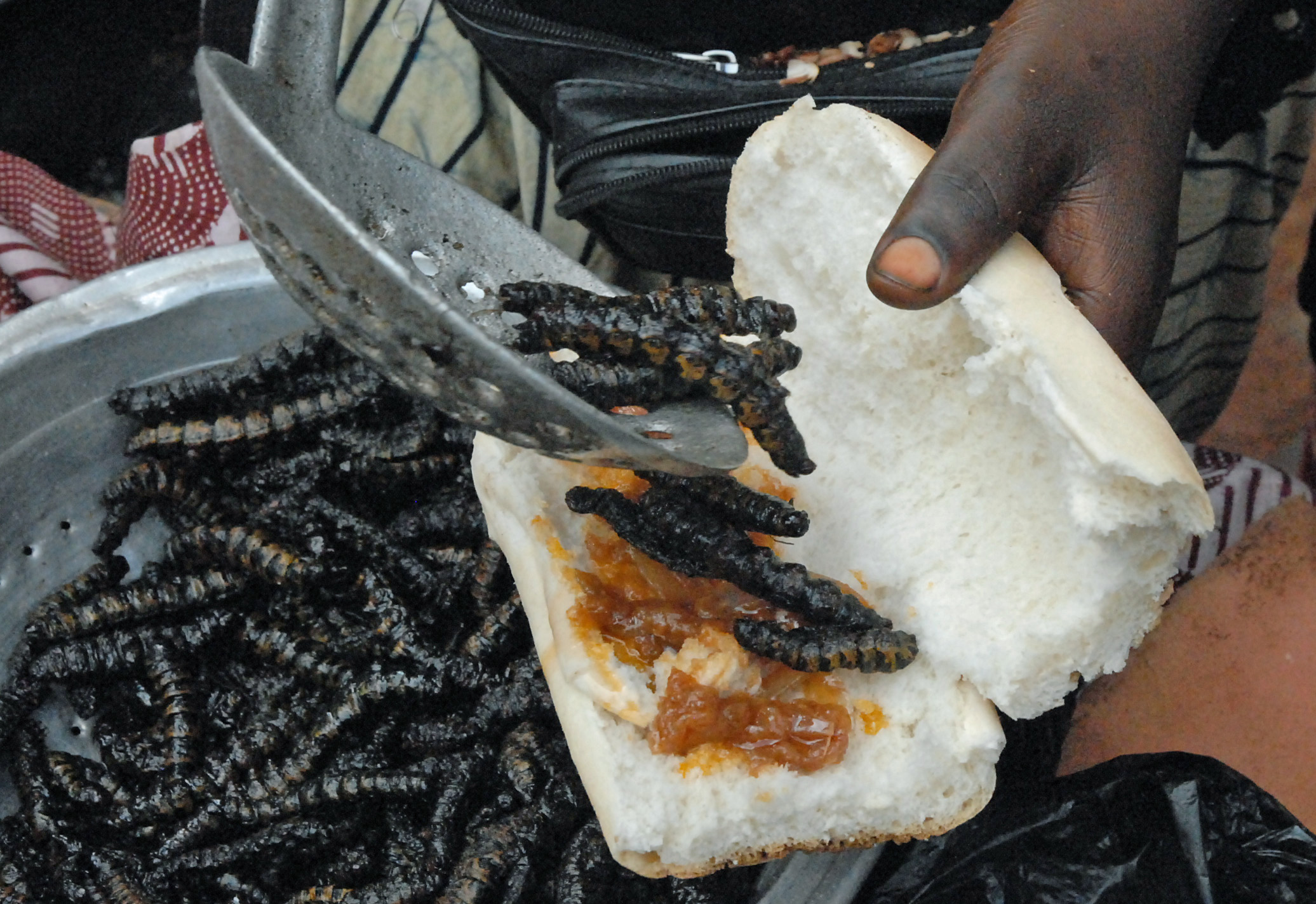
Fried Cirina caterpillars being served on bread for human consumption

Entomophagy in humans or human entomophagy describes the consumption of insects (entomophagy) by humans in a cultural and biological context. The scientific term used in anthropology, cultural studies, biology and medicine is anthropo-entomophagy. Anthropo-entomophagy does not include the eating of arthropods other than insects such as arachnids and myriapods, which is defined as arachnophagy.

Entomophagy is scientifically documented as widespread among non-human primates and common among many human communities. The eggs, larvae, pupae, and adults of certain insects have been eaten by humans from prehistoric times to the present day. Around 3,000 ethnic groups practice entomophagy. Human insect-eating is common to cultures in most parts of the world, including Central and South America, Africa, Asia, Australia, and New Zealand. Eighty percent of the world's nations eat insects of 1,000 to 2,000 species. FAO has registered some 1,900 edible insect species and estimates that there were, in 2005, around two billion insect consumers worldwide. FAO suggests eating insects as a possible solution to environmental degradation caused by livestock production.

In some societies, primarily western nations, entomophagy is uncommon or taboo. While insect eating is uncommon in North America and Europe, insects remain a popular food elsewhere, and some companies are trying to introduce insects as food into Western diets.

Insects eaten around the world include crickets, cicadas, grasshoppers, ants, various beetle grubs (such as mealworms, the larvae of the darkling beetle), and various species of caterpillar (such as bamboo worms, mopani worms, silkworms and waxworms).

Entomophagy, the practice of consuming insects, is frequently proposed as a sustainable alternative to traditional livestock farming. However, recent studies suggest that the widespread adoption of entomophagy in Western countries faces significant challenges, including cultural resistance and economic barriers.

== History ==
=== Precursors of humans and insect consumption ===
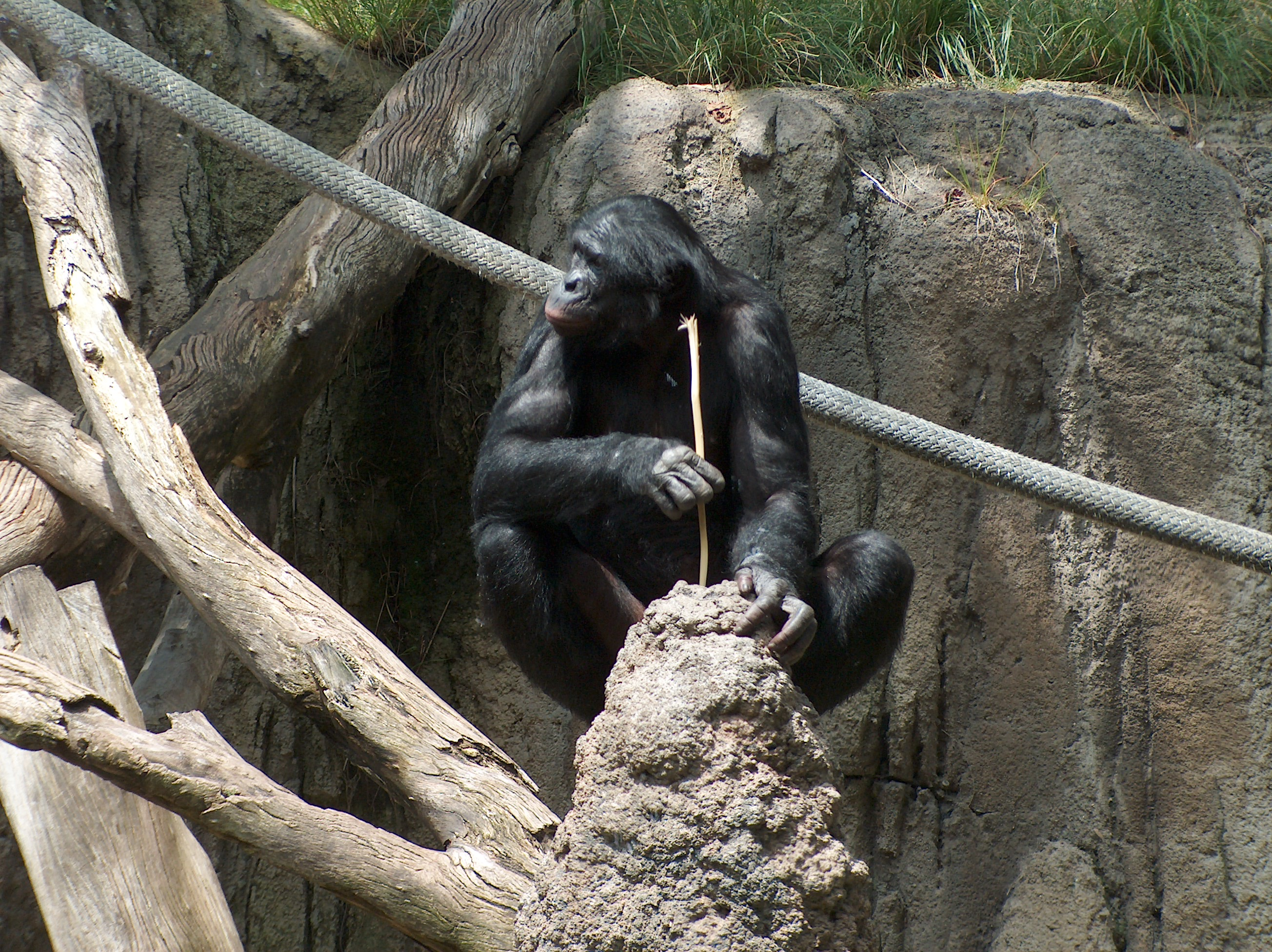
Ancient hominids might have gathered termites similarly to this bonobo using a stick tool.

Evidence suggests that evolutionary precursors of Homo sapiens were entomophagous and arachnophagous. Insectivory also features to various degrees amongst extant primates, such as marmosets and tamarins, and some researchers suggest that the earliest primates were nocturnal, arboreal insectivores. Similarly, most extant apes are insectivorous to some degree.

The archaeological record, in the form of bone tools with wear marks, shows that early hominids such as Paranthropus robustus would gather termites for consumption. Lesnik also reviews multiple studies concluding that wear marks running along the length of the bone are indicative of tools used for digging up termite mounds. These markings are different than those on tools that might have been used to dig up plants and roots, which would have wear marks in multiple directions from digging at a horizontal angle and possibly hitting rocks which are not present in termite hills. Similarly a review of isotope studies show that P. robustus was not eating large amounts of plants and fruits as a source of protein, but it was instead being fulfilled by other means such as animal or insect protein.

Modern human's larger brain size is often attributed to the theory that it was made possible due to an increase in the consumption of meat. The remains of KNM-ER 1808, a specimen of Homo erectus dated to around 1.8 million years ago, has often been used as evidence for the hunter model due to its abnormal bone growths pointing to hypervitaminosis A from consuming excess animal liver. However, Mark Skinner has proposed that consuming bee larvae and pupae could also provide enough vitamin A to cause hypervitaminosis A. Due to insects nutritional value and abundance, they would also be able to provide the necessary amount of protein required for hominin such as H. erectus.

Research in 2026 used analysis of dental calculuses of ancient Europeans to determine the prevalence of entomophagy in Neanderthals and anatomically modern Homo sapiens. This research showed that Neanderthals from multiple regions participated frequently in entomophagy, at similar levels to what is seen in Western Chimpanzees. They showed a notable preference for the order Diptera. Modern humans on the other hand demonstrated much less evidence for entomophagy.

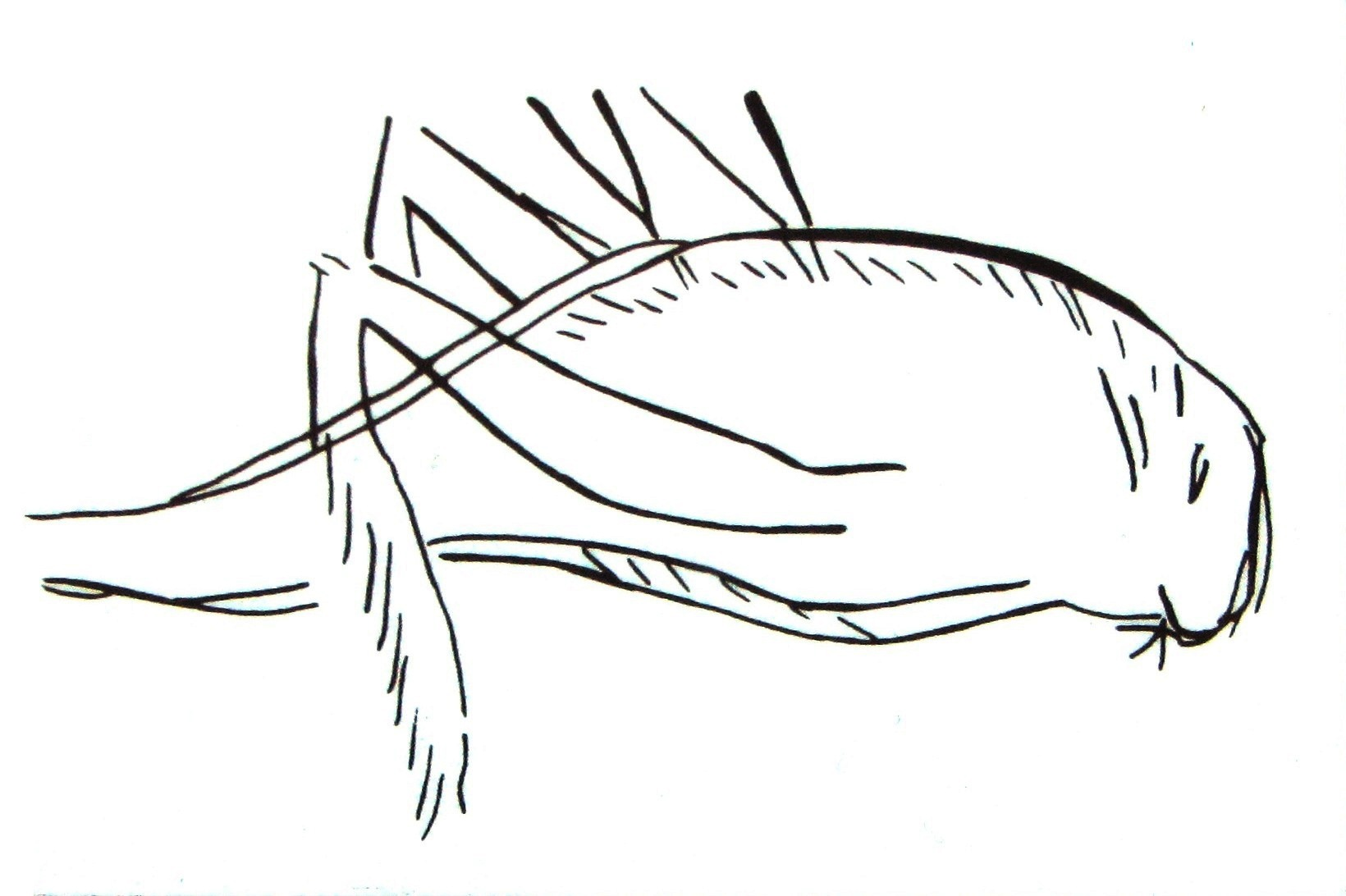
Carving of Cave grasshopper on animal bone discovered in the Magdalenian grotto of Les Trois Frères indicates a possible link with food magic.

=== Coprolites and cave paintings ===
Before humans had tools to hunt or farm, insects may have represented an important part of their diet. Evidence has been found analyzing coprolites from caves in the US and Mexico. Coprolites in caves in the Ozark Mountains were found to contain insects (ants, beetle larvae, lice), as well as arachnids (ticks, mites).

Cave paintings in Altamira, north Spain, which have been dated from about 30,000 to 9,000 BC, depict the collection of edible insects and wild bee nests, suggesting a possibly entomophagous society. Cocoons of wild silkworms (Triuncina religiosae) were found in ruins in Shanxi Province of China, from 2,000 to 2,500 years BC. The cocoons were discovered with large holes in them, suggesting the pupae were eaten. Many ancient entomophagy practices have changed little over time compared with other agricultural practices, leading to the development of modern traditional entomophagy.

== Insect consumption in human cultures ==
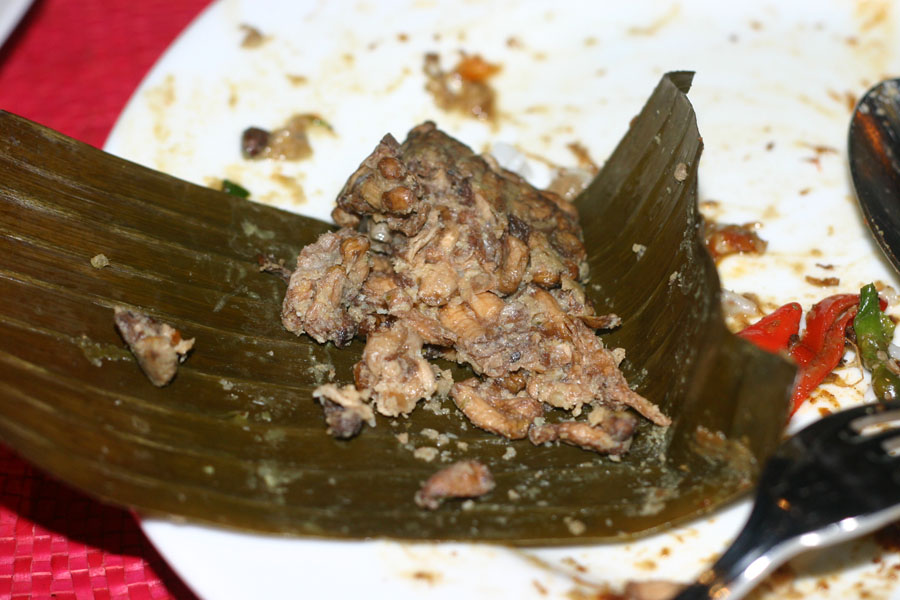
Indonesian botok tawon, spiced bee larvae steamed in banana leaf package

Many cultures embrace the eating of insects. Edible insects have long been used by ethnic groups in Asia, Africa, Mexico and South America as cheap and sustainable sources of protein. Up to 2,086 species are eaten by 3,071 ethnic groups in 130 countries. The species include 235 butterflies and moths, 344 beetles, 313 ants, bees and wasps, 239 grasshoppers, crickets and cockroaches, 39 termites, and 20 dragonflies, as well as cicadas. Insects are known to be eaten in 80 percent of the world's nations.

The leafcutter ant Atta laevigata is traditionally eaten in some regions of Colombia and northeast Brazil. In southern Africa, the widespread moth Gonimbrasia belina's large caterpillar, the mopani or mopane worm, is a source of food protein. In Australia, the witchetty grub is eaten by the indigenous population. The grubs of Hypoderma tarandi, a reindeer parasite, were part of the traditional diet of the Nunamiut people. Udonga montana is a pentatomid bug that has periodic population outbreaks and is eaten in northeastern India.

Traditionally several ethnic groups in Indonesia are known to consume insects—especially grasshoppers, crickets, termites, the larvae of the sago palm weevil, and bees. In Java and Kalimantan, grasshoppers and crickets are usually lightly battered and deep fried in palm oil as a crispy kripik or rempeyek snack. In Banyuwangi, East Java, there is a specialty botok called botok tawon (honeybee botok), which is beehives that contains bee larvae, being seasoned in spices and shredded coconut, wrapped inside a banana leaf package and steamed. Dayak tribes of Kalimantan, also Moluccans and Papuan tribes in Eastern Indonesia, are known to consume ulat sagu (lit. 'sagoo caterpillar') or larvae of sago palm weevil. These protein-rich larvae are considered as a delicacy in Papua, eaten both roasted or uncooked.

In Thailand, certain insects are also consumed, especially in northern provinces. Traditional markets in Thailand often have stalls selling deep-fried grasshoppers, cricket (ching rit), bee larvae, silkworm (non mai), ant eggs (khai mot) and termites.

The use of insects as an ingredient in traditional foodstuffs in places such as Hidalgo in Mexico has been on a large enough scale to cause their populations to decline. In the state of Oaxaca, the use of chapulines (toasted grasshoppers) dates to prehistoric times and today is part of a vibrant economy.

In East Africa, Kunga cake is a food made of densely compressed flies.

=== In Western culture ===
As early as around 700 BC. In 400 BC an Assyrian depiction depicted a feast with locusts as a delicacy. Both the Bible and the Quran contain references to eating locusts. Even in ancient times, the Greeks and Romans ate insects and especially their larvae, such as those of bees and cicadas. Pliny's cossus dwelling in oak, probably a wood borer caterpillar, was considered a delicacy by the Greeks and Romans. The great capricorn beetle (Cerambyx cerdo syn.C. heros) is considered a strong candidate for identification of cossus by some authorities, (Note: Mulsant (1841a)(repub. Mulsant (1841b)), endorsed by Bodenheimer (2013) [1951], pp. 42–43 rejecting Linnaeus's identification with the moth Cossus since it rarely if ever hosts in oak.) and while the stag beetle (Lucanus cervus) grub has also been considered a viable contender, (Note: Rösel von Rosenhof (1742) Latreille Hist. Nat. des Crust. et Insectes, XII: 245 (1802–1805) cited by Bodenheimer (2013) [1951], pp. 42–43) French entomologist Jean-Henri Fabre favored identification with the capricorn beetle's cousin (Note: Both are Prioninae longicorns.) called ergat (Ergates faber), which he taste-tested himself, noting its almond-like flavor. (Note: Albouy et al., quoting Fabre, Souvenirs entomologiques XII, Ch. 6.)

In the study concerning the locust and wild honey diet of John the Baptist, it is mentioned that Greco-Roman writers attest to locust-eating, And for the ancient Israelites, Leviticus 11 prescribes allowing the consumption of four types of "locusts", but besides the arbeh (ארבה) being locust, the ancient insect names in Hebrew were no longer current by the medieval period, requiring an exegesis using current vernacular names, and Maimonides (Rambam) identified eight "species" of insects, including grasshoppers and crickets. But with the grasshoppers, honey and shellac scale insects as exception, insects are overall non-kosher. (Note: Red dye cochineals are forbidden too.) It may be worth noting John the Baptist's "wild honey" is explained as tasting like manna, made into cakes, in the Gospel of the Ebionites. Furthermore, manna is hypothesized as being the honeydew of scale insects (Note: Identified as Trabutina mannipara (obs. Coccus manniparus Ehrenberg) by German-born Israeli entomologist Friedrich Simon Bodenheimer) drawing the sap of tamarisks. A confection derived from aphids feeding on oak, gathered in Kurdistan, is still sold as man in Iraq. There is also the gaz or Persian manna from collected saps of Astragalus adscendens, but in older attestations, the types of high quality described as ges alefi or ges chonsari may have in fact been tamarisk manna or oak manna.

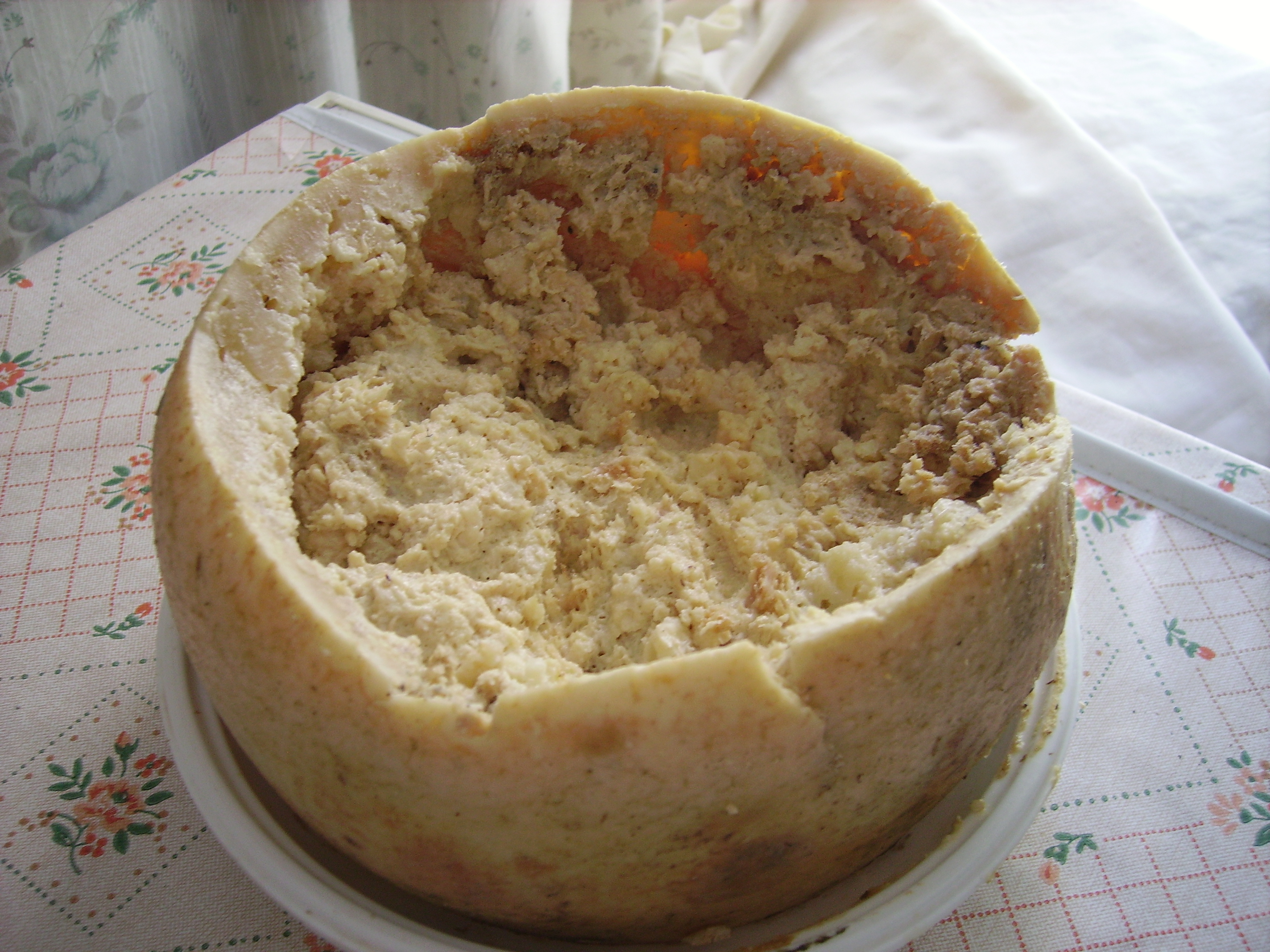
Casu marzu is a traditional Sardinian sheep milk cheese that contains insect larvae.

Although insect products such as honey and carmine are common, eating insects has not been adopted as a widespread practice in the West. There are some exceptions in traditional food. Casu marzu, for example, also called casu modde, casu cundhídu, or in Italian formaggio marcio, is a cheese made in Sardinia notable for being riddled with live insect larvae. Casu marzu means 'rotten cheese' in Sardinian language and is known colloquially as "maggot cheese".

However, there is a trend in the West towards the consumption of insects. By 2011, a few restaurants in the Western world regularly served insects. For example, two places in Vancouver, British Columbia, Canada, offered cricket-based items: (Vij's Restaurant had parathas made from roasted crickets ground into a powder or meal, and its sister restaurant, Rangoli Restaurant, offered pizza made by sprinkling whole roasted crickets on naan dough). Aspire Food Group was the first large-scale insect farming company in North America, using automated machinery in a 25,000-square-foot (2,300 m^{2}) warehouse dedicated to raising organically grown house crickets for human consumption.

== Rejection and cultural taboo ==
Within Western culture, entomophagy (barring some food additives, such as carmine and shellac) is seen as taboo. The disgust associated with the taboo is used in Western media. For example, a scene in the 1962 Italian film Mondo Cane features an insect banquet for shock effect, and a scene from Indiana Jones and the Temple of Doom (1984) features insects as part of a similar banquet for shock factor. Western avoidance of entomophagy coexists with the consumption of other invertebrates such as molluscs and the insects' close arthropod relatives crustaceans, and is not associated with the taste or the perception food value. In recent years, however, a certain level of consumer interest was observed according to related consumer studies, especially in cases when the insects are not identifiable in the processed food (e.g. insect flour in a ready-to-eat food), and consumers made aware of additional values of insect-based food stuffs.

The Maliki school of Islamic jurisprudence is the only tradition that allows the consumption of all insects (provided that they are not harmful to one's health). Some schools consider scorpions haram, but eating locusts as halal. Others prohibit all animals that creep, including insects.

Within Judaism, most insects are not considered kosher, with the disputed exception of a few species of "kosher locust" which are accepted by certain communities.

Public health nutritionist Alan Dangour has argued that large-scale entomophagy in Western culture faces "extremely large" barriers, which are "perhaps currently even likely to be insurmountable." There is widespread disgust at entomophagy in the West, the image of insects being "unclean and disease-carrying". The anthropologist Marvin Harris has suggested that the eating of insects is taboo in cultures that have other protein sources which require more work to obtain, such as poultry or cattle, though there are cultures which feature both animal husbandry and entomophagy. Examples can be found in Botswana, South Africa, and Zimbabwe, where strong cattle-raising traditions co-exist with entomophagy of insects like the mopane worm. In addition, people in cultures where entomophagy is common are not indiscriminate in their choice of insects, as Thai consumers of insects perceive edible insects not consumed within their culture in a similar way as Western consumers.

== Promotion ==
The UN Food and Agriculture Organization has displayed an interest in developing entomophagy on multiple occasions. In 2008, the FAO organized a conference to "discuss the potential for developing insects in the Asia and Pacific region." According to Durst, FAO efforts in entomophagy will focus on regions in which entomophagy has been historically accepted but has recently experienced a decline in popularity.

In 2011, the European Commission issued a request for reports on the current use of insects as food, with the promise that reports from each European Union member state would serve to inform legislative proposals for the new process for insect foods. According to NPR, the European Union is investing more than 4 million dollars to research entomophagy as a human protein source.

Despite these institutional support initiatives, cultural barriers to acceptability remain higher than for other alternative proteins. A comprehensive review of 91 studies found that insect-based proteins ranked lowest in acceptance among meat substitutes, below cultured meat, while plant-based options achieved the highest acceptance rates.

== Advantages of eating insects ==
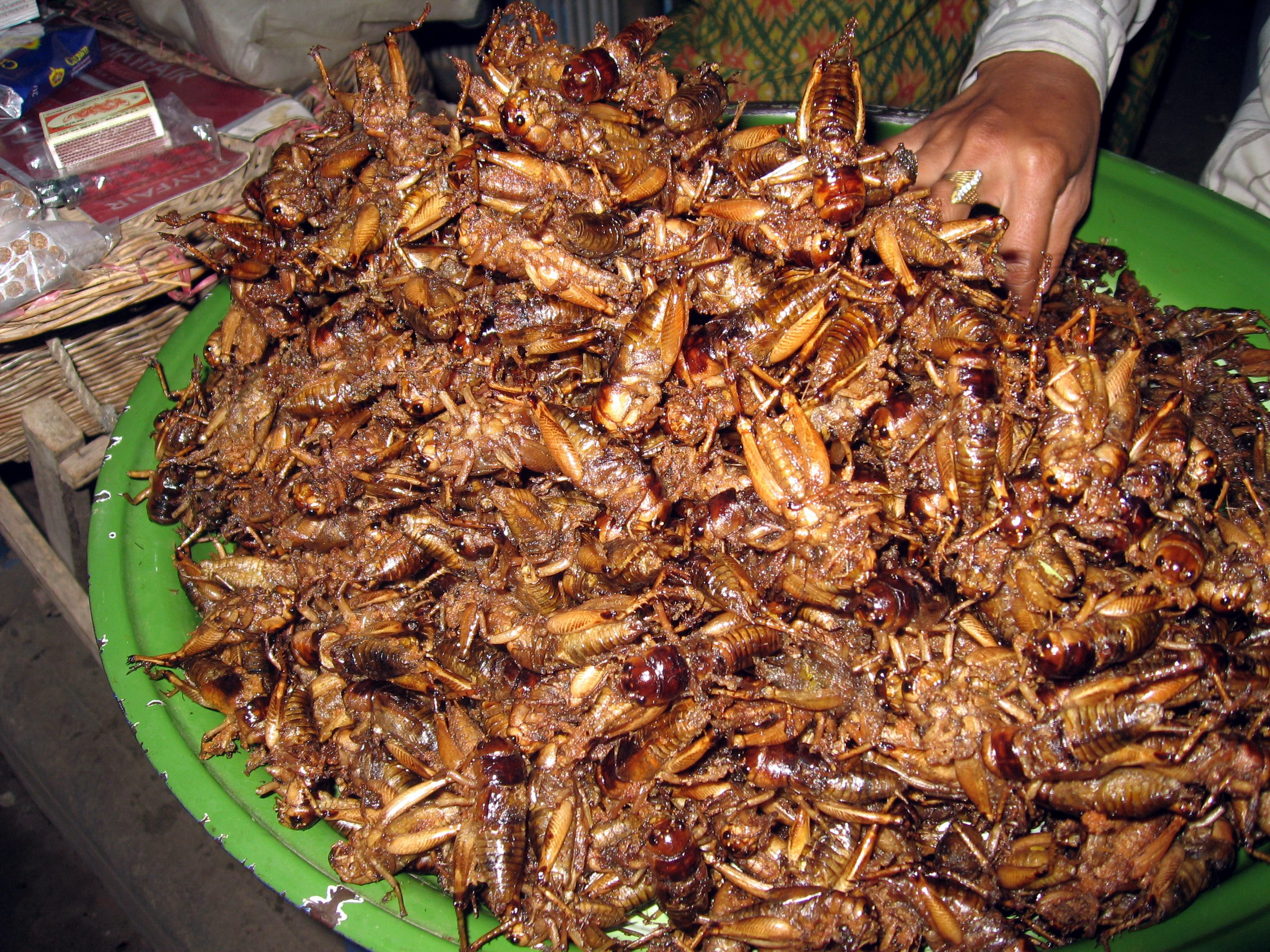
Deep-fried crickets

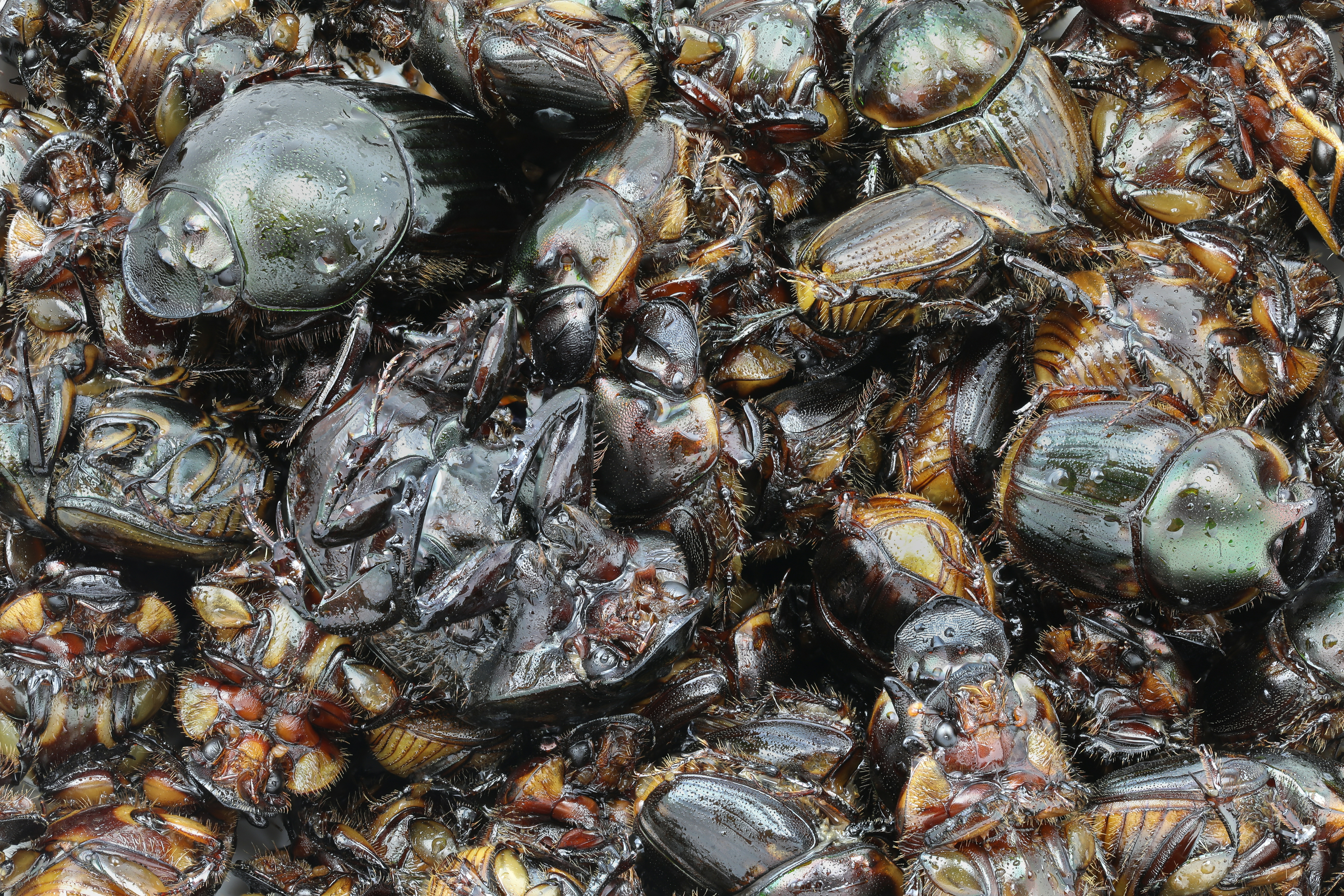
Fried dung beetles in Lao cuisine

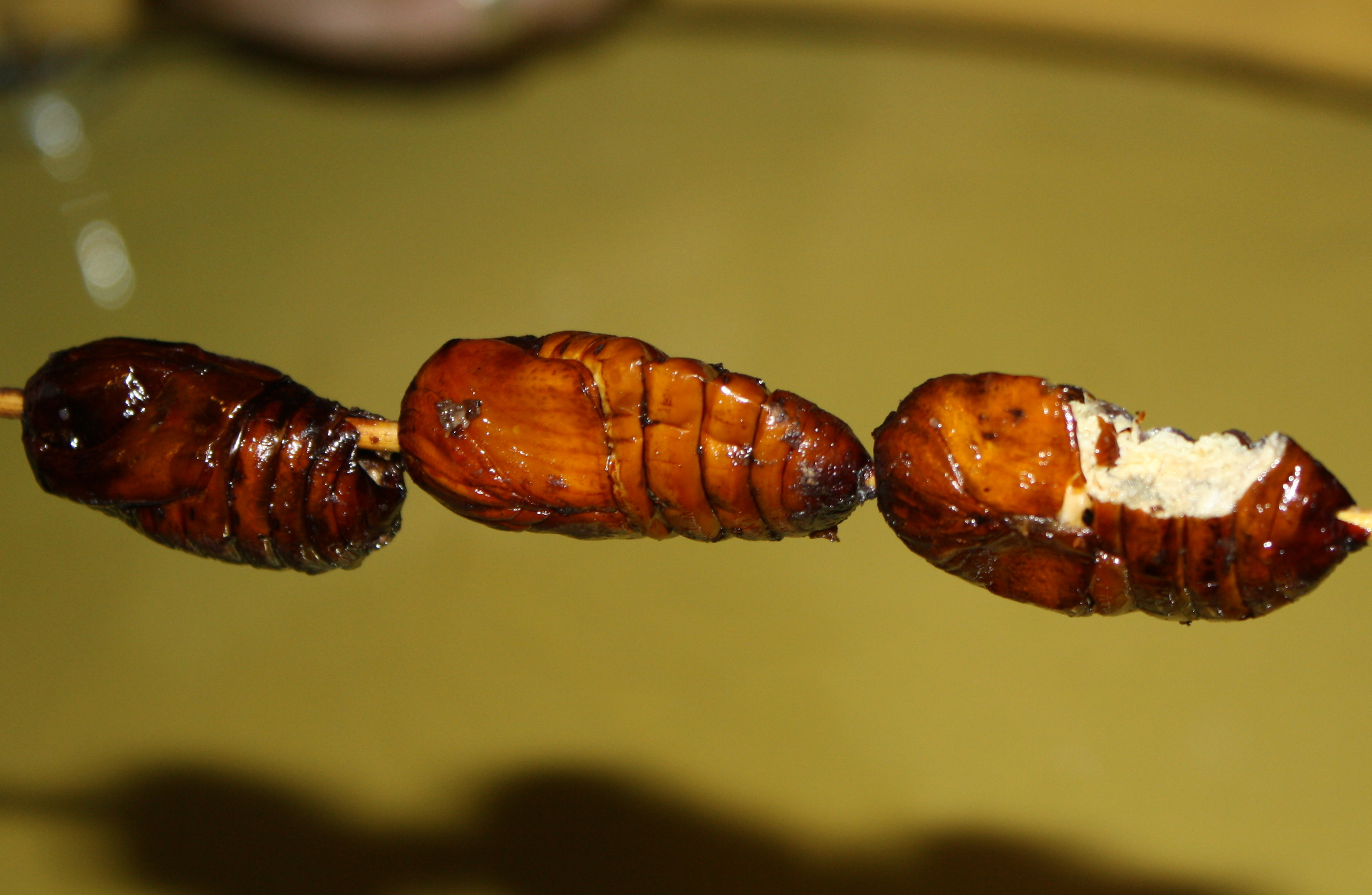
Fried silk worm pupae sold by a street vendor in Jinan, China, one with a bite taken out of it

Assessments of the potential of large-scale entomophagy have led some experts to suggest insects as a potential alternative protein source to conventional livestock, citing possible benefits including greater efficiency, lower resource use, increased food security, and environmental and economic sustainability.

=== Nutritional benefits ===
Insects are a complete protein source (contains all nine essential amino acids) and contain a more useful amount, comparable with protein from soybeans, though less than in casein (found in foods such as cheese). They have dietary fiber and include mostly unsaturated fat and contain some vitamins and essential minerals.

=== Food security ===
While more attention is needed to fully assess the potential of edible insects, they provide a natural source of essential nutrients, offering an opportunity to bridge the gap in protein consumption between poor and wealthy nations and also to lighten the ecological footprint. Many insects contain abundant stores of lysine, an amino acid deficient in the diets of many people who depend heavily on grain. Some argue that the combination of increasing land use pressure, climate change, and food grain shortages due to the use of maize as a biofuel feedstock will cause serious challenges for attempts to meet future protein demand. Women who manage, produce and sell toasted grasshoppers in the southern state of Oaxaca established a touchless market for their product during the Covid-19 pandemic. Their efforts were critical as rural populations in the state were often unable to access markets or afford the costs of other proteins.

The first publication to suggest that edible insects could ease the problems of global food shortages was by Meyer-Rochow in 1975. Insects as food and feed have emerged as an especially relevant issue in the 21st century due to the rising cost of animal protein, food and feed insecurity, environmental pressures, population growth and increasing demand for protein among the middle classes. At the 2013 International Conference on Forests for Food Security and Nutrition, the Food and Agriculture Organization of the United Nations released a publication titled Edible insects – Future prospects for food and feed security describing the contribution of insects to food security. It shows the many traditional and potential new uses of insects for direct human consumption and the opportunities for and constraints to farming them for food and feed. It examines the body of research on issues such as insect nutrition and food safety, the use of insects as animal feed, and the processing and preservation of insects and their products.

=== Sustainability and environmental benefits ===
The methods of matter assimilation and nutrient transport used by insects make insect cultivation a more efficient method of converting plant material into biomass than rearing traditional livestock. More than 10 times more plant material is needed to produce one kilogram of meat than one kilogram of insect biomass. The spatial usage and water requirements are only a fraction of that required to produce the same mass of food with cattle farming. Production of 150g of grasshopper meat requires very little water, while cattle require 3290 liters to produce the same amount of beef. This indicates that lower natural resource use and ecosystem strain could be expected from insects at all levels of the supply chain. Edible insects also display much faster growth and breeding cycles than traditional livestock. An analysis of the carbon intensity of five edible insect species conducted at the University of Wageningen, Netherlands found that "the average daily gain (ADG) of the five insect species studied was 4.0–19.6 percent, the minimum value of this range being close to the 3.2% reported for pigs, whereas the maximum value was 6 times higher. Compared to cattle (0.3%), insect ADG values were much higher." Additionally, all insect species studied produced much lower amounts of ammonia than conventional livestock, though further research is needed to determine the long-term impact. The authors conclude that insects could serve as a more environmentally friendly source of dietary protein. However, the environmental benefits of insect-based products are contingent upon their widespread adoption. If the population is unwilling to consume these products, the anticipated ecological advantages may not be realized within the food system. A comprehensive review of 91 studies by Onwezen et al. found that insect-based proteins ranked lowest in acceptance among meat substitutes, even below cultured meat. In contrast, plant-based alternatives achieved the highest acceptance rates, with some reaching as high as 91%.

To realize systemic environmental benefits, it is also crucial to consider the economic and scalability factors. However, the insect-based protein industry has struggled to demonstrate positive outcomes in these areas. Economically, the sector remains heavily reliant on public funding, with several commercial failures highlighting these challenges. For example, the Canadian company Aspire Food Group, which received over $35 million in public support, laid off 66% of its workforce in November 2024. Similarly, the French company Ÿnsect, despite securing €600 million in investment (half of which came from public funds), went into receivership in March 2025, according to its co-founder. Additionally, the cost of insect-based feed remains significantly higher than traditional alternatives, with prices estimated to be 2 to 10 times more expensive than conventional feeds like fish meal or soybean meal. This economic vulnerability is further exacerbated in Europe, where the colder climate and higher labor costs reduce competitiveness compared to tropical regions like Southeast Asia, where insect farming benefits from more favorable temperatures (25-30°C) for insect growth.

According to the United Nations Food and Agriculture Organization (FAO), animal agriculture makes a "very substantial contribution" to climate change, air pollution, land, soil and water degradation, land use concerns, deforestation and the reduction of biodiversity. The high growth and intensity of animal agriculture has caused ecological damage worldwide; with meat production predicted to double from now to 2050, maintaining the status quo's environmental impact would demand a 50 percent reduction of impacts per unit of output. As the FAO states, animal livestock "emerges as one of the top two or three most significant contributors to the most serious environmental problems, at every scale from local to global." Some researchers argue that establishing sustainable production systems will depend upon a large-scale replacement of traditional livestock with edible insects; such a shift would require a major change in Western perceptions of edible insects, pressure to conserve remaining habitats, and an economic push for food systems that incorporate insects into the supply chain.

In total, the emissions of the livestock sector account for 18 percent of total anthropogenic greenhouse gas emissions, a greater share than the transportation sector. Using the ratio between body growth realized and carbon production as an indicator of environmental impact, conventional agriculture practices entail substantial negative impacts as compared to entomophagy. The University of Wageningen analysis found that the CO _{2} production per kilogram of mass gain for the five insect species studied was 39–129% that of pigs and 12–54% that of cattle. This finding corroborates existing literature on the higher feed conversion efficiency of insects as compared to mammalian livestock. For four of the five species studied, GHG emission was "much lower than documented for pigs when expressed per kg of mass gain and only around 1% of the GHG emission for ruminants."

=== Economic benefits ===
Insects generally have a higher food conversion efficiency than more traditional meats, measured as efficiency of conversion of ingested food, or ECI. While many insects can have an energy input to protein output ratio of around 4:1, raised livestock has a ratio closer to 54:1. This is partially due to the fact that feed first needs to be grown for most traditional livestock. Additionally, endothermic (warm-blooded) vertebrates need to use a significantly greater amount of energy just to stay warm, whereas ectothermic (cold-blooded) plants or insects do not. An index that can be used as a measure is the Efficiency of conversion of ingested food to body substance: for example, only 10% of ingested food is converted to body substance by beef cattle, versus 19–31% by silkworms and 44% by German cockroaches. Studies concerning the house cricket (Acheta domesticus) provide further evidence for the efficiency of insects as a food source. When reared at 30 °C or more and fed a diet of equal quality to the diet used to rear conventional livestock, crickets showed a food conversion twice as efficient as pigs and broiler chicks, four times that of sheep, and six times higher than steers when losses in carcass trim and dressing percentage are counted.

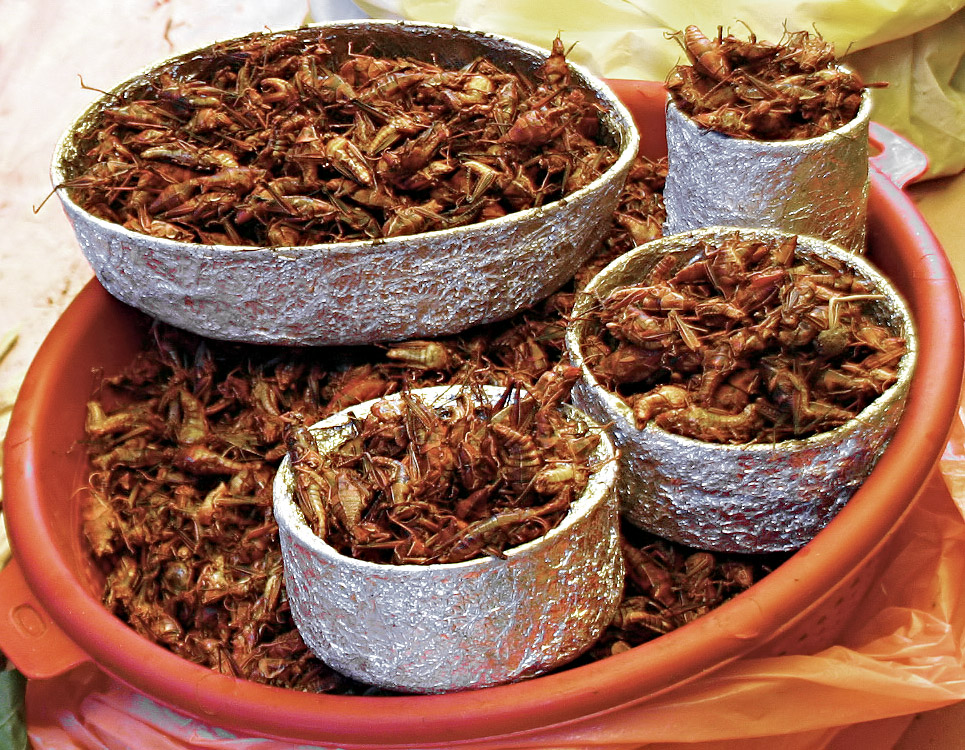
Mexican chapulines

Insects reproduce at a faster rate than beef animals. A female cricket can lay from 1,200 to 1,500 eggs in three to four weeks, while for beef the ratio is four breeding animals for each market animal produced. This gives house crickets a true food conversion efficiency almost 20 times higher than beef.

=== Scalability ===
The intentional cultivation of insects and edible arthropods for human food is now emerging in animal husbandry as an ecologically sound concept. Several analyses have found insect farming to be a more environmentally friendly alternative to traditional animal livestocking.

In Thailand, two types of edible insects (cricket and palm weevil larvae) are commonly farmed in the north and south respectively. Cricket-farming approaches throughout the northeast are similar and breeding techniques have not changed much since the technology was introduced 15 years ago. Small-scale cricket farming, involving a small number of breeding tanks, is rarely found today and most of the farms are medium- or large-scale enterprises. Community cooperatives of cricket farmers have been established to disseminate information on technical farming, marketing and business issues, particularly in northeastern and northern Thailand. Cricket farming has developed into a significant animal husbandry sector and is the main source of income for a number of farmers. In 2013, there were approximately 20,000 farms operating 217,529 rearing pens. Total production over the last six years (1996–2011) has averaged around 7,500 tonnes per year.

In the Western world, new agricultural technology companies have been founded in the 2010s with the aim of modernizing insect rearing techniques, permitting the scale and efficiency gains required for insects to displace other animal proteins in the human food supply.

=== Indigenous cultivation ===
Edible insects can provide economic, nutritional, and ecological advantages to the indigenous populations that raise them. For instance, the mopane worm of South Africa provides a "flagship taxon" for the conservation of mopane woodlands. Some researchers have argued that edible insects provide a unique opportunity for insect conservation by combining issues of food security and forest conservation through a solution that includes appropriate habitat management and recognition of local traditional knowledge and enterprises. Cultures in Africa have developed unique interactions with insects as a result of their traditional ecological management practices and customs. However, senior FAO forestry officer Patrick Durst claims that "Among forest managers, there is very little knowledge or appreciation of the potential for managing and harvesting insects sustainably. On the other hand, traditional forest-dwellers and forest-dependent people often possess remarkable knowledge of the insects and their management."

Similarly, Julieta Ramos-Elorduy has stated that rural populations, who primarily "search, gather, fix, commercialize and store this important natural resource", do not exterminate the species which are valuable to their lives and livelihoods. According to the FAO, many experts see income opportunities for rural people involved in cultivation. However, adapting food technology and safety standards to insect-based foods would enhance these prospects by providing a clear legal foundation for insect-based foods.

=== Pest harvesting ===
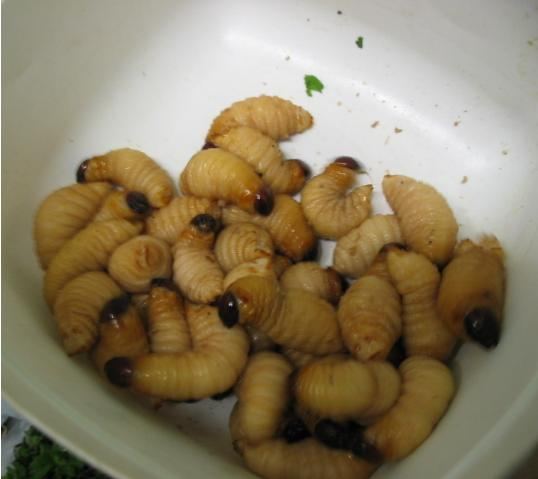
Larvae of the weevil Rhynchophorus bilineatus, a pest of palm trees, are a delicacy in Papua New Guinea and eastern Indonesia.

Some researchers have proposed entomophagy as a solution to policy incoherence created by traditional agriculture, by which conditions are created which favor a few insect species, which then multiply and are termed "pests". In parts of Mexico, the grasshopper Sphenarium purpurascens is controlled by its capture and use as food. Such strategies allow decreased use of pesticides and create a source of income for farmers totaling nearly US$3000 per family. Environmental impact aside, some argue that pesticide use is inefficient economically due to its destruction of insects which may contain up to 75 percent animal protein in order to save crops containing no more than 14 percent protein.

=== Use as therapeutic foods ===
Director of pediatric nutrition at the University of Alabama at Birmingham Frank Franklin has argued that since low calories and low protein are the main causes of death for approximately five million children annually, insect protein formulated into a ready-to-use therapeutic food similar to Nutriset's Plumpy'Nut could have potential as a relatively inexpensive solution to malnutrition. In 2009, Dr. Vercruysse from Ghent University in Belgium proposed that insect protein could be used to generate hydrolysates, exerting both ACE inhibitory and antioxidant activity, which might be incorporated as a multifunctional ingredient into functional foods. Additionally, edible insects can provide a good source of unsaturated fats, thereby helping to reduce coronary disease.

In 2012, Dr. Aaron T. Dossey announced that his company, All Things Bugs, had been named a Grand Challenges Explorations winner by the Bill & Melinda Gates Foundation. Grand Challenges Explorations provides funding to individuals with ideas for new approaches to public health and development. The research project is titled "Good Bugs: Sustainable Food for Malnutrition in Children".

== Disadvantages and challenges ==
=== Spoilage ===
Spore-forming bacteria can spoil both raw and cooked insect protein, threatening to cause food poisoning. While edible insects must be processed with care, simple methods are available to prevent spoilage. Boiling before refrigeration is recommended; drying, acidification, or use in fermented foods also seem promising.

=== Toxicity ===
Many insects are herbivorous and less problematic than omnivores. Cooking is advisable in ideal circumstances since parasites of concern may be present. But pesticide use can make insects unsuitable for human consumption. Herbicides can accumulate in insects through bioaccumulation. For example, when locust outbreaks are treated by spraying, people can no longer eat them. This may pose a problem since edible plants have been consumed by the locusts themselves.

In some cases, insects may be edible regardless of their toxicity. In the Carnia region of Italy, moths of the Zygaenidae family have been eaten by children despite their potential toxicity. The moths are known to produce hydrogen cyanide precursors in both larvae and adults. However, the crops of the adult moths contain cyanogenic chemicals in extremely low quantities along with high concentrations of sugar, making Zygaena a convenient supplementary source of sugar during the early summer. The moths are very common and easy to catch by hand, and the low cyanogenic content makes Zygaena a minimally risky seasonal delicacy.

Cases of lead poisoning after consumption of chapulines were reported by the California Department of Health Services in November 2003.

=== Economic difficulties ===
Many manufacturers in the sector have decided to shift their focus from human food to animal feed to overcome these obstacles, with today’s negligible market shares and limited opportunities, at least for the time being.

=== Allergic reactions ===
Adverse allergic reactions are a potential hazard of insect consumption. Cross-reactivity between edible insects and crustaceans has been identified as clinically relevant in one review. A study on the prevalence of allergies to edible insects in Thailand indicated that:

[A]pproximately 7.4% of people experienced an adverse reaction indicative of an edible-insect allergy and 14.7% of people experienced multiple adverse reactions indicative of an edible-insect allergy. Furthermore, approximately 46.2% of people who already suffer from a known food-based allergy also experienced symptoms indicative of an allergic reaction after insect consumption.

Recent research has further demonstrated that proteins from edible insects such as the yellow mealworm (Tenebrio molitor) can act as significant allergens, potentially inducing IgE-mediated sensitization and cross-reactivity. Notable allergenic proteins identified in yellow mealworm include tropomyosin, arginine kinase, α-amylase, heat shock proteins (HSP70), and Tenebrio-specific larval cuticle protein. Larval cuticle proteins are structural proteins forming part of the insect exoskeleton and cuticle, and in mealworm larvae they present unique epitopes capable of binding IgE antibodies in sensitized individuals. Their presence may contribute to cross-reactivity with allergens from other arthropods, but may also represent species-specific sensitization relevant to T. molitor consumption. Individuals with clinical allergy symptoms related to tropomyosin from house dust mite (Der p 10) or shrimp (Pen m 1) are advised to exercise caution when consuming products containing yellow mealworm, due to possible cross-reactive allergic reactions.

=== Acceptability ===
Efforts to promote insect consumption as an ecological alternative to meat are severely limited by low cultural acceptability and disgust, especially in Western countries, and may not be sufficient to replace traditional meat. In comparison, other alternative proteins have much higher acceptance rates: A comprehensive review of 91 studies found that insect-based proteins ranked lowest in acceptance among meat substitutes, below cultured meat, while plant-based options achieved the highest acceptance rates, reaching up to 91%.

=== Ethical objections ===
The humaneness of insect consumption has been questioned. One objection is the large numbers of individuals raised and killed per unit of protein—exacerbated by a high tendency towards premature mortality—in comparison to other animal-based foods. The potential for insects to be conscious, and as a result experience pain and suffering, has also been raised as a concern.

=== Negative sustainability aspects ===
Concerns have been raised about the sustainability of insect consumption, such as overexploitation due to wild-harvesting. Food used to feed the insects raised for consumption may also have a large environmental footprint, which when scaled-up, could potentially make insect consumption similarly sustainable to traditional protein sources, negating any alleged benefit. Additionally, edible insect preservation processes such as freeze-drying and grinding may use a large amount of energy. Insect consumption has been suggested to be more sustainable than consumption of other animals.

== See also ==
- Entomoculture
- Environmental impact of meat production
- Human interactions with insects
- Insects as feed
- Insect-based pet food
- Insects in medicine
- List of edible insects by country
- Sustainable agriculture
- Taboo food and drink
- Welfare of farmed insects
