= Entomophagy =

Practice of eating insects by organisms

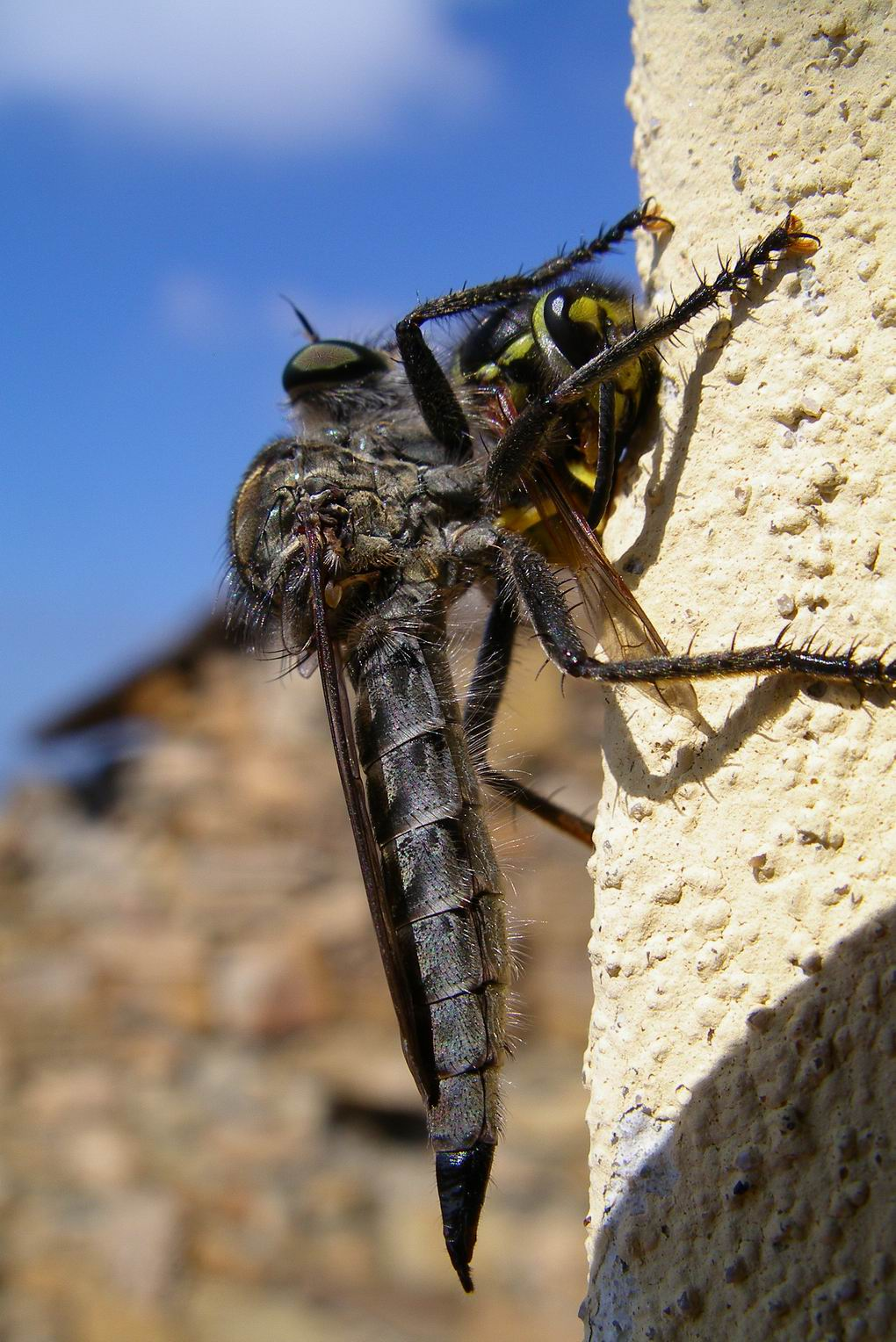
Robber fly feeding on wasp

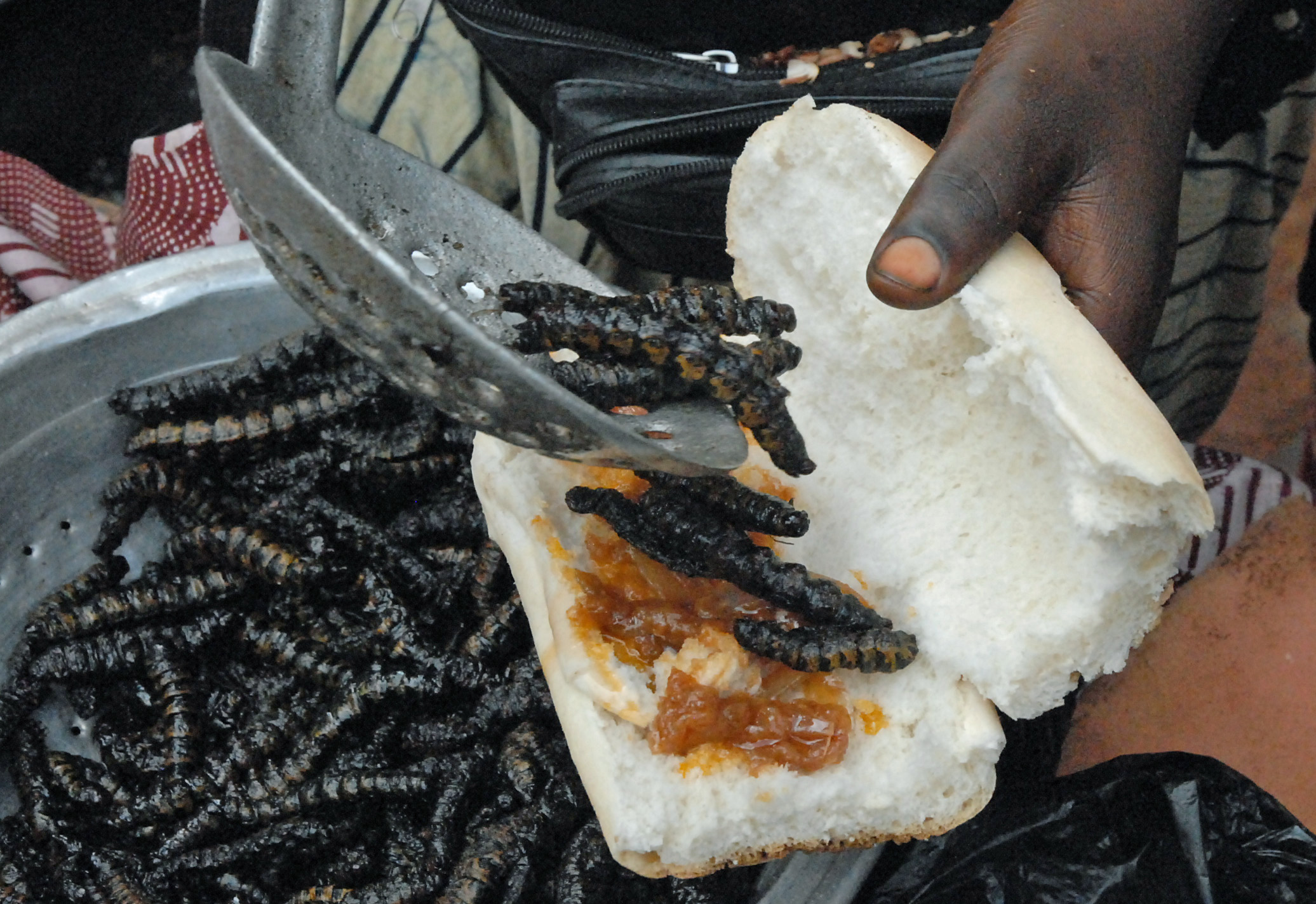
Fried saturniid caterpillars being served on bread for human consumption in Burkina Faso in 2015

Entomophagy (/ˌɛntəˈmɒfədʒi/, from Greek ἔντομον éntomon, 'insect', and φαγεῖν phagein, 'to eat') is the practice of eating insects. An alternative term, usually applied to animals, is insectivory.

Entomophagy is sometimes defined to also include the eating of arthropods other than insects, such as arachnids and myriapods; eating arachnids may also be referred to as arachnophagy.

== In non-humans ==
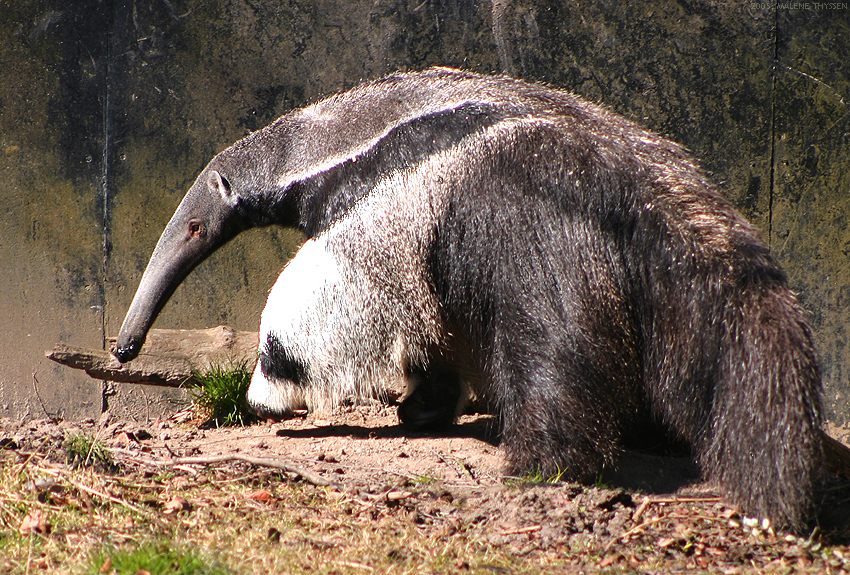
Entomophagy among animals: The giant anteater is a mammal specialized in eating insects

Entomophagy is widespread among many animals, including non-human primates. Animals that feed primarily on insects are called insectivores.

Insects, nematodes and fungi that obtain their nutrition from insects are sometimes termed entomophagous, especially in the context of biological control applications. These may also be more specifically classified into predators, parasites or parasitoids, while viruses, bacteria and fungi that grow on or inside insects may also be termed entomopathogenic (see also entomopathogenic fungi).

== In humans ==
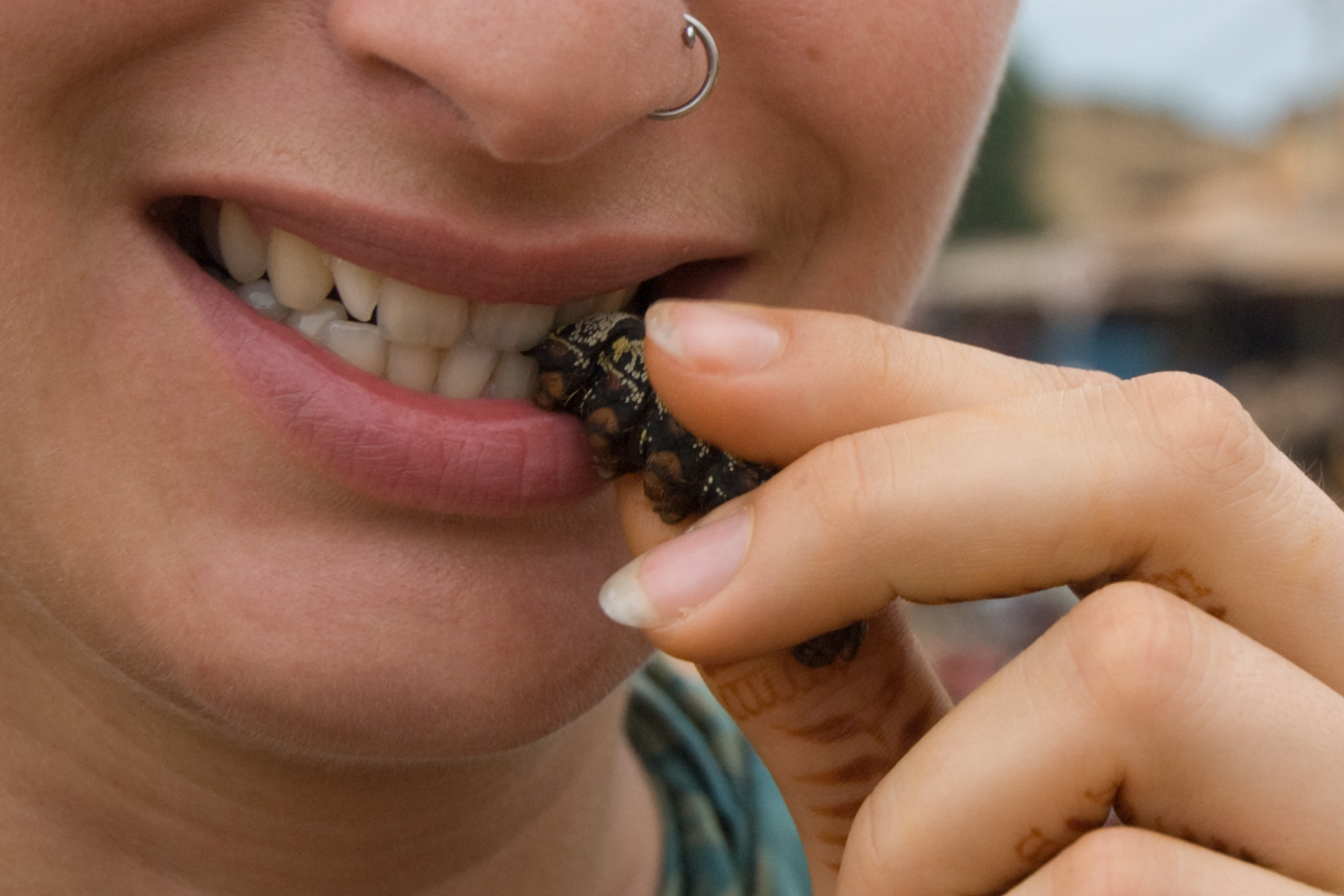
Human consumption of a cirina larva in Burkina Faso

Entomophagy is scientifically described as widespread among non-human primates and common among many human communities. The scientific term describing the practice of eating insects by humans is anthropo-entomophagy. The eggs, larvae, pupae, and adults of certain insects have been eaten by humans from prehistoric times to the present day. Around 3,000 ethnic groups practice entomophagy. Human insect-eating (anthropo-entomophagy) is common to cultures in most parts of the world, including Central and South America, Africa, Asia, Australia, and New Zealand. Eighty percent of the world's nations eat insects of 1,000 to 2,000 species. FAO has registered some 1,900 edible insect species and estimates that there were, in 2005, some two billion insect consumers worldwide. FAO suggests eating insects as a possible solution to environmental degradation caused by livestock production. While these products are increasingly available, recent research suggests that insect-based foods are unlikely to significantly replace traditional meat. Only a small minority of consumers would consider replacing meat with insects. In the US and Europe, where insects are not traditionally eaten, cultural barriers and disgust limit adoption, leading most companies to focus on the animal feed market. Furthermore, the feeding of insects today is done through the valorization of agricultural by-products based on cereals, rather than food waste, which is already being used in livestock feed. This significantly reduces the ecological benefits of insect farming.

In some societies, primarily western nations, entomophagy is uncommon or taboo. Today, insect eating is uncommon in North America and Europe, but insects remain a popular food elsewhere, and some companies are trying to introduce insects as food into Western diets. A 2022 analysis of Google Trends data showed that people in Japan have become increasingly interested in entomophagy since 2013.

== See also ==
- Insects as feed
- Human interactions with insects
  - Insects in medicine
  - Insects as food
- Taboo food and drink
