= List of edible insects by country =

The following are edible insects that are locally consumed, as listed by country.

== Australia ==
- Agrotis infusa (Bogong moth)
- Bush coconut
- Honeypot ant
- Hyles livornicoides (Yeperenye caterpillar)
- Witchetty grub

== Burkina Faso ==
- Cirina butyrospermi (shea caterpillar)

== Brazil ==
- Atta spp.

== Colombia ==
Ant

- (Hormigas Culonas/Big-Butt Ant) Atta laevigata
- Leafcutter ant
- Liometopum apiculatum (pupae)
- Liometopum occidental (pupae)

Beetle

- Caryobruchus scheelaea
- Dung Beetle
- Euchroma giganteum
- Onthophagus taurus
- Podischnus agenor
- Suri (larvae)

Caterpillar

- Batiya
- Hutia

Dobsonfly

- Corydalus spp.

Grasshopper

- Aidemona azteca
- Schistocerca
- (Short-Horned Grasshopper) Acrididae
- Sphenarium
- Tropidacris latreillei

Stinkbug

- Atizies taxcoensis

Termites

Wasp

- (Polybia ignobilis) (egg, larvae)
- (Potter wasps) Eumenes canaliculata (larvae)

== China ==
Wasp species eaten in Yunnan, China:

- Vespa velutinia auraria
- Vespa tropica ducalis
- Vespa analis nigrans
- Vespa variabilis
- Vespa sorror
- Vespa basalis
- Vespa magnifica
- Vespa mandarinia mandarinia
- Vespa bicolor bicolor
- Provespa barthelemyi
- Polistes sagittarius

Other insects consumed in China:

- Tenebrio molitor (mealworm)
- Omphisa fuscidentalis (bamboo borer)
- Bombyx mori (silkworm pupa)

== European Union ==
(Mainly: Netherland & Belgium)

- Melolontha melolontha (Common Cockchafer)
- Yellow mealworm (of Beetle Tenebrio molitor)
- Alphitobius diaperinus (Buffalo worm)
- Locusta migratoria (Locust / Grasshopper)

== Fiji ==
- Olethrius

== India ==
- Darthula hardwickii
- Oecophylla Smaragdina
- Trichonephila clavata
- Udonga montana

== Indonesia ==
Insect species eaten in Indonesia:

- Hyblaea puera (teak caterpillar; known as enthung jati in Javanese)
- Brachytrupes portentosus
- Valanga nigricornis
- Patanga succincta
- Pantala flavescens
- Rhynchophorus ferrugineus (red palm weevil)
- Chalcosoma atlas
- Xylocopa latipes

=== Kalimantan ===
- Protocerius sp.
- Rhynchophorus ferrugineus
- Batocera spp.
- Lepidiota stigma
- Chalcosoma moellenkampi
- Odontolabis spp.
- Leptocorisa oratoria (rice ear bug)
- Nezara viridula (green stinkbug)
- Pomponia merula
- Apis dorsata
- Apis cerana
- Ropalidia spp.
- Provespa anomala
- Vespa spp.
- Vespa tropica
- Vespa affinis

=== Papua Province ===
- Rhynchophorus bilineatus
- Cosmopsaltria waine
- Syntherata apicalis
- Xylotrupes gideon
- Cotinis spp.
- Batocera spp.
- Dihammus spp.
- Rosenbergia mandibularis
- Nezara viridula
- Behrensiellus glabratus
- Rhynchophorus richteri
- Behrensiellus glabradus
- Acherontia lachesis
- Nyctalemon patroclus goldiei
- Batocera wallacei
- Papilio laglaizei

== Laos ==
Insect species eaten in Vientiane Province, Laos:

- Omphisa fuscidentalis
- Orientopsaltria sp.
- Brachytrupes portentosus
- Teleogryllus testaceus
- Acheta domesticus
- Helicopris bucephalus
- Lethocerus indicus
- Caelifera sp.
- Apis spp.
- Xylotrupes gideon
- Gryllotalpa africana
- Bombyx mori
- Tessaratoma quadrata
- Hierodula sp. ?
- Vespa spp.
- Hydrophilus affinis
- Oecophylla smaragdina

== Madagascar ==
Insects eaten in Madagascar:

- Acheta domesticus (Zazavery)
- Amphimallon solstitiale (Voangory)
- Bombyx mori (Landikely)
- Borocera cajani (Landibe)
- Borocera madagascariensis (Landibe)
- Bricoptis variolosa (Voangory)
- Gryllus bimaculatus (Akitra)
- Hexodon unicolor (Voangory)
- Locusta migratoria (Valala)
- Phyllophaga sp. (Voangory)
- Rhynchophorus sp. (Voangory)
- Rina nigra (Voanosy)
- Scarites sp. (Voangory)
- Serica sp. (Voangory)
- Tenebrio molitor (Voangory)

== Malaysia ==
Insects eaten in Sabah:

- Rhynchophorus ferrugineus
- Apis dorsata
- Apis cerana
- Ropalidia spp.
- Leptocorisa oratoria (rice ear bug)
- Nezara viridula (green stinkbug)
- Erionata thrax (banana leaf-roller pupa)
- Orientopsaltria spp. (brown and green cicadas)
- Dundubia spp. (light green cicadas)
- Oecophylla smaragdina
- Camponotus gigas (giant forest ant)
- Haaniella grayii grayi (stick insect eggs)

and in Sarawak:

- Rhynchophorus ferrugineus (sago worm)

== Mali ==
The Northern Dogon people of Mopti Region, Mali consume grasshopper species such as:

- Acorypha glaucopsis
- Kraussaria angulifera (also a millet pest)
- Kraussella amabile
- Hieroglyphus daganensis

The Southern Region of Mali consume caterpillar species such as:

- Cirina butyrospermi (shea caterpillar)

== Mexico ==
- Aegiale hesperiaris (maguey worm)
- Atta mexicana (ant)
- Comadia redtenbacheri (mezcal worm)
- Dactylopius coccus females used as red food dye
- Eucheira socialis (Madrone butterfly)
- Sphenarium spp. (chapulines)
- Liometopum apiculatum and L. occidentale var. luctuosum larvae (escamol)
- Several Coleoptera larvae (chahuis)
- Several Coreidae or Pentatomidae adult stink bugs (Jumiles)

== New Caledonia ==
- Agrianome fairmairei (Montrouzier, 1861) (Vers de Bancoule)

== New Zealand ==
- Prionoplus reticularis (Huhu grub)

== Peru ==
Insect species eaten in Peru:

- Brassolis sophorae (Ahuihua)
- Metardaris cosinga (Huaytampo)
- Chrysophora chrysochlora (Sun-sún)
- Rhynchophorus palmarum (Suri, Shampuru)
- Rhinostomus barbirostris (Yurak suri, Suri blanco)
- Atta cephalotes (Mamaku, Sikisapakuru)
- Metamasius hemipterus
- Strategus jugurtha
- Megaceras crassum
- Cephalotes atratus
- Crematogaster sordidula
- Agelaia pallipes
- Mischocyttaru spp.
- Cyphomyia auriflamma
- Macrodontia cervicornis
- Acrocinus longimanus
- Dynastes hercules
- Platycoelia lutescens
- Atta sexdens
- Euchroma gigantea (Intimaman)
- Brassolis astyra
- Eupalamides cyparissias
- Crematogaster stollii
- Polybia platycephala
- Polybia furnaria
- Helicoverpa zea
- Chloridea virescens
- Mocis latipes (Vareador)
- Lusura chera
- Arsenura armida (Bolasho, Bolayna awiwa)

== Philippines ==
Insect species eaten in the Philippines:

- Apis dorsata
- Apis cerana
- Trigona biroi
- Gryllotalpa sp.
- Leucopholis irrorata (June beetle larvae)
- Locusta migratoria manilensis
- Camponotus spp.
- Palembus dermestoides

== Reunion ==
- Polistes olivaceus (yellow oriental paper wasp)

== Samoa ==
- Olethrius

== South Africa ==
- Gonimbrasia belina (mopane worm)
- Encosternum delegorguei (inflated stinkbug)

== South Korea ==
- Bombyx mori (silkworm pupa)

== Thailand ==
Some of the most commonly consumed insects in Thailand are:

- Acheta domestica (house cricket)
- Gryllus bimaculatus (Mediterranean field cricket)
- Brachytrupes portentosus (short-tailed cricket)
- Omphisa fuscidentalis (bamboo borer)
- Bombyx mori (silkworm pupa)
- Oecophylla smaragdina (weaver ant)
- Lethocerus indicus (giant water bug)

Heterometrus longimanus (Asian forest scorpion) is also consumed.

Below is a more comprehensive list of the insect species that are consumed in Thailand.

Coleoptera

- Aeolesthes sp.
- Agrianome fairmairei (Montrouzier, 1861)
- Apriona germari
- Aristobia approximator
- Dorysthenes buqueti
- Plocaederus obesus
- Plocaederus ruficornis
- Arrhines hiruts
- Arrhines 2 spp.
- Astycus gestvoi
- Cnaphoscapus decoratus
- Episomus sp.
- Hypomesus squamosus
- Pollendera atomaria
- Sepiomus aurivilliusi
- Tanymecus sp.
- Rhynchophorus ferrugineus
- Hydrobiomorpha spinicollis
- Hydrophilus bilineatus
- Sternolophus rufipes
- Erectes stiticus
- Cybister tripunctatus asiaticus
- Cybister limbatus
- Cybister rugosus
- Hydaticus rhantoides
- Laccophilus pulicarius
- Copelatus sp.
- Rhantaticus congestus
- Xylotrupes gideon
- Oryctes rhinoceros
- Adoretus spp.
- Agestrata orichalca
- Anomala anguliceps
- Anomala antique
- Anomala chalcites
- Anomala cupripes
- Anomala pallida
- Apogonia sp.
- Chaetadoretus cribratus
- Holotrichia 2 spp.
- Maladera sp.
- Pachnessa sp.
- Protaetia sp.
- Sophrops absceussus
- Sophrops bituberculatus
- Sophrops rotundicollis
- Sophrops 2 spp.
- Aphodius crenatus
- Aphodius marginellus
- Aphodius putearius
- Aphodius sp.
- Catharsius birmanicus
- Catharsius molossus
- Copris carinicus
- Copris nevinsoni
- Paracopris punctulatus
- Microcopris reflexus
- Paracopris sp.
- Gymnopleurus melanarius
- Heliocopris bucephalus
- Heteronychus lioderes
- Liatongus rhadamitus
- Onitis niger
- Onitis subopagus
- Onthophagus orientalis
- Onthophagus avocetta
- Onthophagus bonasus
- Onthophagus khonmiinitnoi
- Onthophagus papulatus
- Onthophagus sagittarius
- Onthophagus seniculus
- Onthophagus ragoides
- Onthophagus tragus
- Onthophagus tricornis
- Onthophagus trituber
- Onthophagus sp.
- Sternocera aequisignata
- Sternocera ruficornis

Hemiptera

- Diplonychus sp.
- Lethocerus indicus
- Anoplocnemis phasiana
- Homoeocerus sp.
- Cylindrostethus scrutator
- Laccotrephes rubber
- Ranatra longipes thai
- Ranatra varripes
- Anisops barbutus
- Anisops bouvieri
- Pygopalty sp.
- Tessaratoma papillosa
- Tessaratoma javanica

Odonata

- Aeshna sp.
- Ceriagrion sp.
- Epophtalmia vittigera bellicose
- Rhyothemis sp.

Hymenoptera

- Apis dorsata
- Apis florea
- Oecophylla smaragdina
- Carebara castanea
- Vespa affinis indosinensis

Orthoptera

- Acrida cinerea
- Acrida sp.
- Chondacris rosea
- Chorthippus sp.
- Cyrtacanthacris tatarica
- Ducetia japonica
- Locusta migratoria
- Mecopoda elongate
- Oxya sp.
- Parapleurus sp.
- Patanga japonica
- Patanga succincta
- Shirakiacris shirakii
- Trilophidia annulata
- Atractomorpha sp.
- Ratanga avis
- Teleogryllus testaceus
- Teleogryllus mitratrus
- Teleogryllus sp.
- Modicogryllus confirmatus
- Brachytrupes portentosus
- Gryllus bimaculatus
- Gryllus sp.
- Gymnogryllus 2 spp.
- Pteronemobius sp.
- Velarifictorus sp.
- Gryllotalpa africana microphtalma
- Tenodera ariddifolia sinensis
- Mantis religiosa
- Euparatettix sp.
- Euconocephalus incertus
- Conocephalus maculates
- Conocephalus sp.
- Onomarchus sp.
- Pseudophyllus titan
- Homoeoxipha sp.

Isoptera

- Macrotermes gilvus

Lepidoptera

- Bombyx mori
- Erionota thrax thrax
- Omphisa fuscidentalis

Homoptera

- Chremistica sp.
- Dundubia sp.
- Orientopsaltria sp.
- Platylomia sp.

== Tonga ==
- Olethrius

== Venezuela ==
- Leafcutter ant

== Wallis and Futuna ==
- Olethrius

== Zimbabwe ==
- Flying termites/ Izinhlwa in Northern Ndebele language
- Solder termites/ Amagenga in Northern Ndebele language
- Mopane worms/ Amacimbi in Northern Ndebele language
- Edible stink bugs/ Umtshiphela in Northern Ndebele language
