= Pachnessa drumonti =

Scientific classification
- Kingdom: Animalia
- Phylum: Arthropoda
- Clade: Pancrustacea
- Class: Insecta
- Order: Coleoptera
- Suborder: Polyphaga
- Infraorder: Scarabaeiformia
- Family: Scarabaeidae
- Genus: Pachnessa
- Species: P. drumonti

Binomial name
- Pachnessa drumonti Keith, 2009

Species of beetle

Pachnessa drumonti is a species of beetle of the family Scarabaeidae. It is found in Cambodia.

== Description ==
Adults reach a length of about 7.8 mm. They are similar to Pachnessa smetsi, but have an entirely yellowish-brown upper surface (except for the reddish-brown head and protibiae).

== Etymology ==
The species is named after Alain Drumont.
