= Pharaphodius pallescens =

Scientific classification
- Kingdom: Animalia
- Phylum: Arthropoda
- Clade: Pancrustacea
- Class: Insecta
- Order: Coleoptera
- Suborder: Polyphaga
- Infraorder: Scarabaeiformia
- Family: Scarabaeidae
- Genus: Pharaphodius
- Species: P. pallescens

Binomial name
- Pharaphodius pallescens (Walker, 1871)

Synonyms
- Aphodius pallescens Walker, 1871; Aphodius gibbifrons Fairmaire, 1892

Species of beetle

Pharaphodius pallescens is a species of beetle of the family Scarabaeidae. It is found in Eritrea, Ethiopia, Kenya, Namibia, Somalia, Egypt and Saudi Arabia.

== Description ==
Adults reach a length of about 5–5.5 mm (0.20–0.22 in). They are similar to Pharaphodius desertus in colour, and are also shiny, but somewhat more slender. It also differs in the more distinct punctation of the head and the less deeply emarginate clypeus. The elytra have a darker longitudinal streak on the disc.
