= Aidemona amrami =

Scientific classification
- Kingdom: Animalia
- Phylum: Arthropoda
- Class: Insecta
- Order: Orthoptera
- Suborder: Caelifera
- Family: Acrididae
- Genus: Aidemona
- Species: A. amrami

Binomial name
- Aidemona amrami Roberts, 1947

Synonyms
- Aidemona azteca amrami Roberts, 1947

Species of grasshopper

Aidemona amrami is a species of grasshopper found in southern Mexico.

H.R. Roberts originally described this taxon in 1947 as a subspecies of A. azteca based on a specimen from Chiapas in 1947. It was later determined to be its own distinct species in 2003.

The largest females of the species can grow as long as 25 millimetres (0.98 in). Morphologically, the species can be identified by its larger size, its large tegmina which are long enough to pass behind the back femur, its wide and blunt cerci, and the shape and high level of sclerotization of parts of their genitalia.
