= Pharaphodius attritus =

Scientific classification
- Kingdom: Animalia
- Phylum: Arthropoda
- Clade: Pancrustacea
- Class: Insecta
- Order: Coleoptera
- Suborder: Polyphaga
- Infraorder: Scarabaeiformia
- Family: Scarabaeidae
- Genus: Pharaphodius
- Species: P. attritus

Binomial name
- Pharaphodius attritus (Balthasar, 1933)

Synonyms
- Aphodius (Pharaphodius) attritus Harold, 1862

Species of beetle

Pharaphodius attritus is a species of beetle of the family Scarabaeidae. It is found in China (Yunnan).

== Description ==
Adults reach a length of about 7.5 mm (0.30 in). They have an almost dull or faintly glossy, moderately convex, brown or reddish-brown body, with a fine, shagreen-like texture. The anterior margin of the clypeus and the sides and base of the pronotum are lighter and the striae on the elytra are somewhat darker.
