= Pharaphodius indicus =

Scientific classification
- Kingdom: Animalia
- Phylum: Arthropoda
- Clade: Pancrustacea
- Class: Insecta
- Order: Coleoptera
- Suborder: Polyphaga
- Infraorder: Scarabaeiformia
- Family: Scarabaeidae
- Genus: Pharaphodius
- Species: P. indicus

Binomial name
- Pharaphodius indicus (Petrovitz, 1958)

Synonyms
- Aphodius (Pharaphodius) indicus Petrovitz, 1958

Species of beetle

Pharaphodius indicus is a species of beetle of the family Scarabaeidae. It is found in India (Tamil Nadu).

== Description ==
Adults reach a length of about 5–6 mm (0.20–0.24 in). They have a slightly convex, very shiny, dark reddish-brown body. The anterior margin of the head and the sides of the pronotum are lighter.
