= Pharaphodius sundaicus =

Scientific classification
- Kingdom: Animalia
- Phylum: Arthropoda
- Clade: Pancrustacea
- Class: Insecta
- Order: Coleoptera
- Suborder: Polyphaga
- Infraorder: Scarabaeiformia
- Family: Scarabaeidae
- Genus: Pharaphodius
- Species: P. sundaicus

Binomial name
- Pharaphodius sundaicus (Balthasar, 1946)

Synonyms
- Aphodius (Pharaphodius) sundaicus Balthasar, 1946

Species of beetle

Pharaphodius sundaicus is a species of beetle of the family Scarabaeidae. It is found in Indonesia (Sulawesi).

== Description ==
Adults reach a length of about 4.5–5 mm (0.18–0.20 in). They have an elongate-oval, convex, shiny body. The head and pronotum are dark brown, while the front of the head and the sides of the pronotum are lighter. The elytra are yellowish-brown to light reddish-brown.
