= Pharaphodius acutus =

Scientific classification
- Kingdom: Animalia
- Phylum: Arthropoda
- Clade: Pancrustacea
- Class: Insecta
- Order: Coleoptera
- Suborder: Polyphaga
- Infraorder: Scarabaeiformia
- Family: Scarabaeidae
- Genus: Pharaphodius
- Species: P. acutus

Binomial name
- Pharaphodius acutus (Schmidt, 1908)

Synonyms
- Aphodius acutus Schmidt, 1908

Species of beetle

Pharaphodius acutus is a species of beetle of the family Scarabaeidae. It is found in Pakistan.

== Description ==
Adults reach a length of about 6–6.5 mm (0.24–0.26 in). They have a slightly convex, glossy, black body, with only the front of the head reddish and translucent.
