= Pharaphodius argutus =

Scientific classification
- Kingdom: Animalia
- Phylum: Arthropoda
- Clade: Pancrustacea
- Class: Insecta
- Order: Coleoptera
- Suborder: Polyphaga
- Infraorder: Scarabaeiformia
- Family: Scarabaeidae
- Genus: Pharaphodius
- Species: P. argutus

Binomial name
- Pharaphodius argutus (Schmidt, 1910)

Synonyms
- Aphodius argutus Schmidt, 1910

Species of beetle

Pharaphodius argutus is a species of beetle of the family Scarabaeidae. It is found in Cameroon, Gabon, Ghana, Ivory Coast, Malawi, the Democratic Republic of the Congo, the Republic of the Congo and Tanzania.

== Description ==
Adults reach a length of about 3 mm (0.12 in). They have a short, stout, convex, reddish-brown body, with the underside, head, sides of the pronotum and elytra and the scutellum lighter, while the disc of the elytra is darker than the center of the pronotum.
