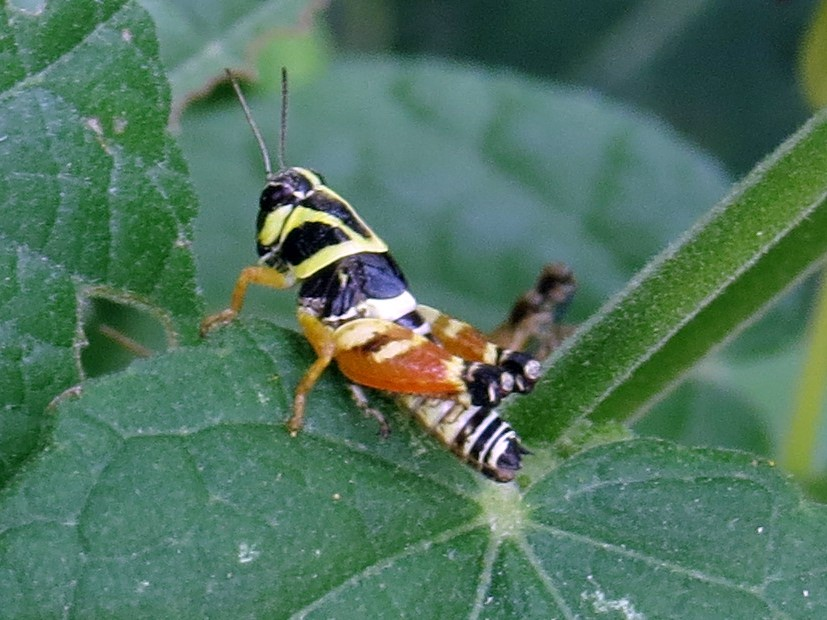
- Aidemona azteca

Scientific classification
- Domain: Eukaryota
- Kingdom: Animalia
- Phylum: Arthropoda
- Class: Insecta
- Order: Orthoptera
- Suborder: Caelifera
- Family: Acrididae
- Subfamily: Melanoplinae
- Tribe: Melanoplini
- Genus: Aidemona; Brunner, 1893

= Aidemona =

Genus of grasshoppers

Aidemona is a genus of spur-throated grasshoppers in the family Acrididae. There are about five described species in Aidemona.

== Species ==
These five species belong to the genus Aidemona:

- Aidemona alticola Roberts, H.R., 1947^{c g}
- Aidemona amrami Roberts, H.R., 1947^{c g}
- Aidemona azteca (Saussure, 1861)^{i c g b} (Aztec spur-throat)
- Aidemona scarlata Cigliano & D. Otte, 2003^{c g}
- Aidemona sonorae Roberts, H.R., 1947^{c g}

Data sources: i = ITIS, c = Catalogue of Life, g = GBIF, b = Bugguide.net
