= Omphisa leucostolalis =

Scientific classification
- Kingdom: Animalia
- Phylum: Arthropoda
- Class: Insecta
- Order: Lepidoptera
- Family: Crambidae
- Subfamily: Spilomelinae
- Tribe: Margaroniini
- Genus: Omphisa
- Species: O. leucostolalis

Binomial name
- Omphisa leucostolalis Hampson, 1918

Species of moth

Omphisa leucostolalis is a moth in the family Crambidae. It was described by George Hampson in 1918. It is found in Malawi.
