= Omphisa caustalis =

Scientific classification
- Kingdom: Animalia
- Phylum: Arthropoda
- Class: Insecta
- Order: Lepidoptera
- Family: Crambidae
- Subfamily: Spilomelinae
- Tribe: Margaroniini
- Genus: Omphisa
- Species: O. caustalis

Binomial name
- Omphisa caustalis Hampson, 1913

Species of moth

Omphisa caustalis is a moth in the family Crambidae. It was described by George Hampson in 1913. It is found in the Democratic Republic of the Congo (North Kivu) and Uganda.
