= Pharaphodius lacunosus =

Scientific classification
- Kingdom: Animalia
- Phylum: Arthropoda
- Clade: Pancrustacea
- Class: Insecta
- Order: Coleoptera
- Suborder: Polyphaga
- Infraorder: Scarabaeiformia
- Family: Scarabaeidae
- Genus: Pharaphodius
- Species: P. lacunosus

Binomial name
- Pharaphodius lacunosus (Schmidt, 1910)

Synonyms
- Aphodius lacunosus Schmidt, 1910; Aphodius (Pharaphodius) panchrestus Balthasar, 1971

Species of beetle

Pharaphodius lacunosus is a species of beetle of the family Scarabaeidae. It is found in Ethiopia, the Democratic Republic of the Congo, Senegal, Somalia and Sudan.

== Description ==
Adults reach a length of about 3.5–4 mm (0.14–0.16 in). They have a shiny, blackish-brown body, with the front of the head, the sides of the pronotum and elytra, the scutellum and the suture more reddish.
