= Pharaphodius vernilis =

Scientific classification
- Kingdom: Animalia
- Phylum: Arthropoda
- Clade: Pancrustacea
- Class: Insecta
- Order: Coleoptera
- Suborder: Polyphaga
- Infraorder: Scarabaeiformia
- Family: Scarabaeidae
- Genus: Pharaphodius
- Species: P. vernilis

Binomial name
- Pharaphodius vernilis (Schmidt, 1910)

Synonyms
- Aphodius vernilis Schmidt, 1910

Species of beetle

Pharaphodius vernilis is a species of beetle of the family Scarabaeidae. It is found in Saudi Arabia, Oman and Yemen (Socotra).

== Description ==
Adults reach a length of about 6–7 mm (0.24–0.28 in). They have an elongate-oval, glossy, light reddish-yellow or yellowish-brown body, with the back of the head, the margin of the scutellum and the sutural edge of the elytra darker.
