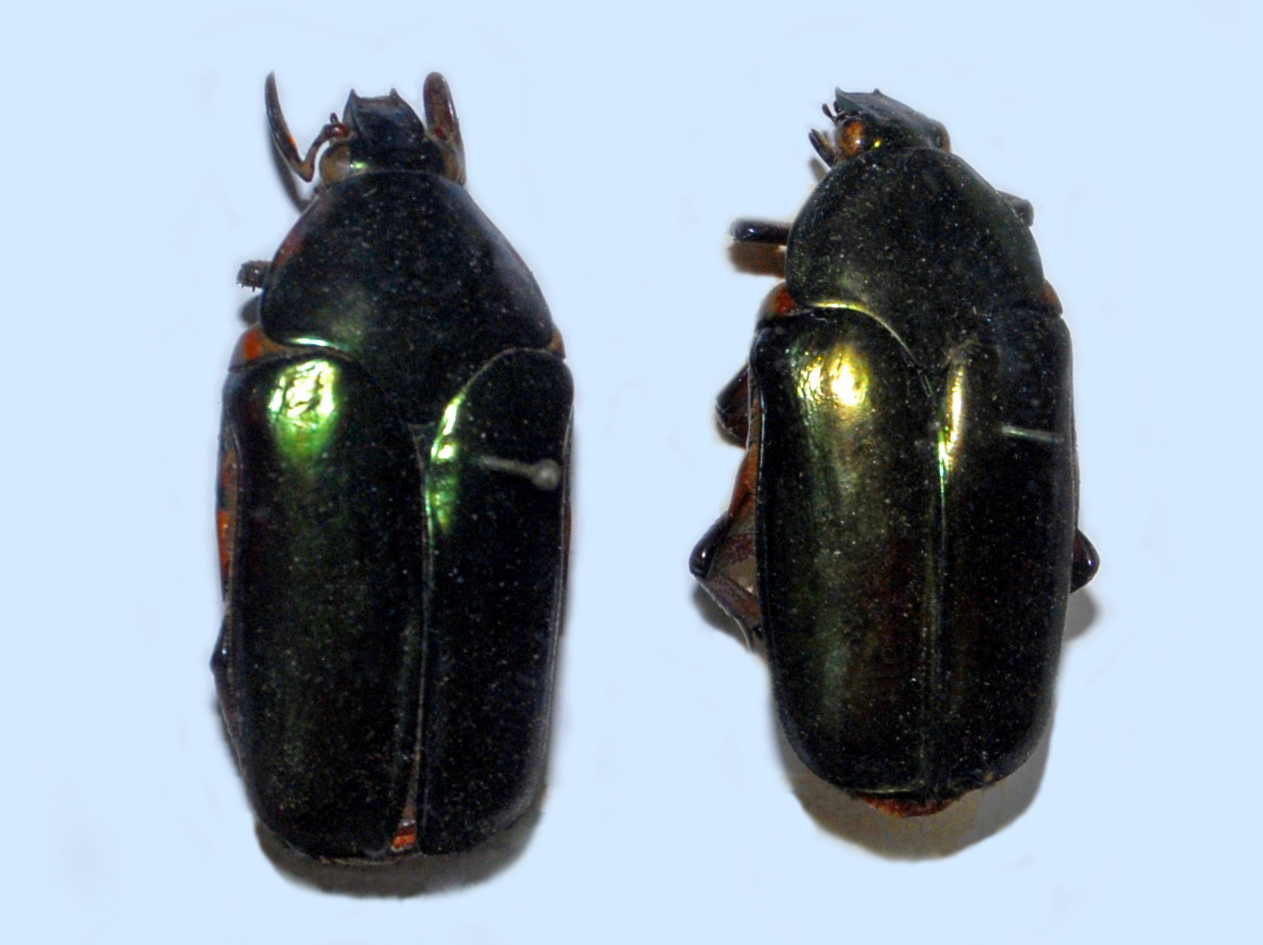
- Agestrata orichalca. Mounted specimen.

Scientific classification
- Kingdom: Animalia
- Phylum: Arthropoda
- Class: Insecta
- Order: Coleoptera
- Suborder: Polyphaga
- Infraorder: Scarabaeiformia
- Family: Scarabaeidae
- Genus: Agestrata; Eschscholtz, 1829

= Agestrata =

Genus of beetles

Agestrata is a genus of scarab beetles (insects of the family Scarabaeidae).

== Selected species ==
- Agestrata alexisi Devecis, 2004
- Agestrata arnaudi Allard, 1990
- Agestrata dehaani Gory & Percheron, 1833
- Agestrata orichalca (Linnaeus, 1789)
- Agestrata semperi Mohnike, 1873
