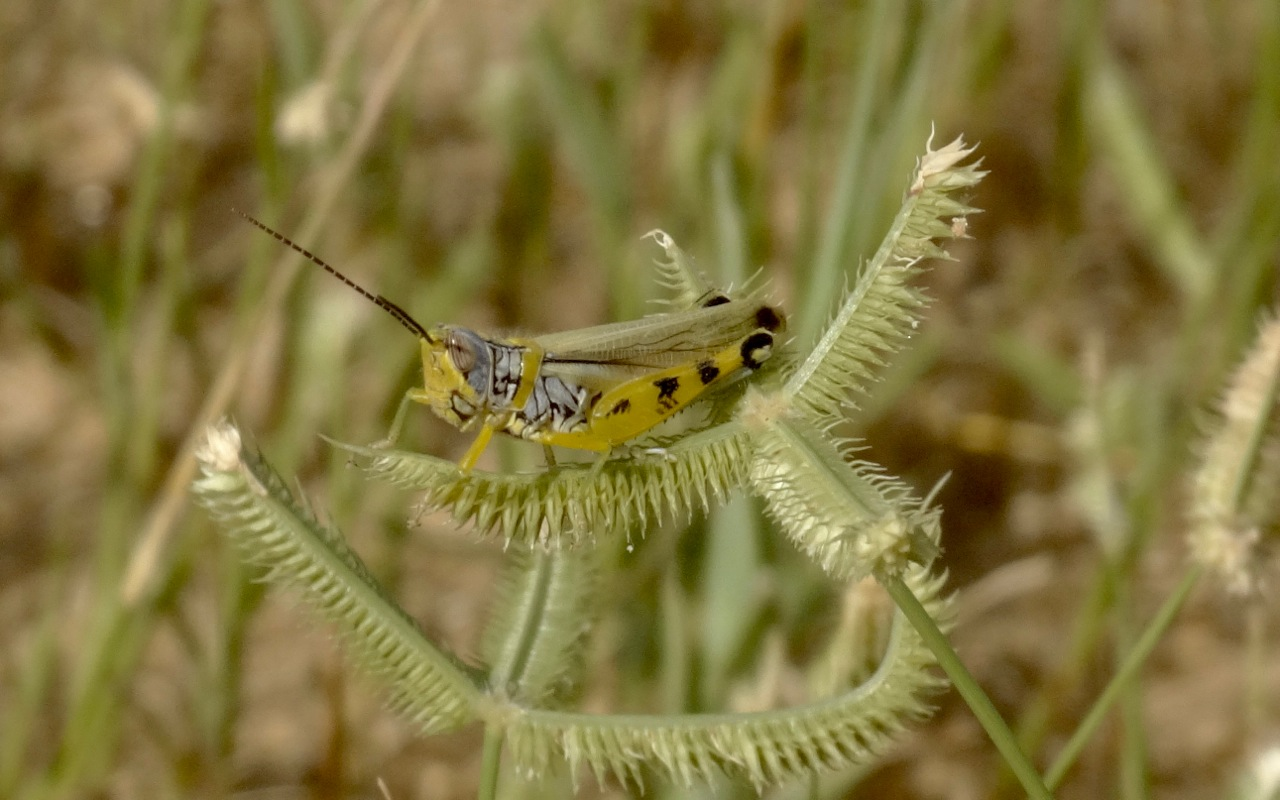
- Male Kraussella amabile photographed near Belbedji, Zinder Region, Niger

Scientific classification
- Domain: Eukaryota
- Kingdom: Animalia
- Phylum: Arthropoda
- Class: Insecta
- Order: Orthoptera
- Suborder: Caelifera
- Family: Acrididae
- Subfamily: Gomphocerinae
- Genus: Kraussella; Bolívar, 1909

Type species
- Kraussella amabile (Krauss, 1877)

= Kraussella =

Genus of grasshoppers

Kraussella is a genus of grasshoppers in the family Acrididae, subfamily Gomphocerinae.

== Species ==
Orthoptera Species File lists:

- Kraussella amabile (Krauss, 1877)
- Kraussella coerulipes (Karny, 1917)

In Mali, Kraussella amabile is eaten by the Dogon people.
