= Pharaphodius putearius =

Scientific classification
- Kingdom: Animalia
- Phylum: Arthropoda
- Clade: Pancrustacea
- Class: Insecta
- Order: Coleoptera
- Suborder: Polyphaga
- Infraorder: Scarabaeiformia
- Family: Scarabaeidae
- Genus: Pharaphodius
- Species: P. putearius

Binomial name
- Pharaphodius putearius (Reitter, 1895)

Synonyms
- Aphodius putearius Reitter, 1895; Aphodius nigellus Schmidt, 1909

Species of beetle

Pharaphodius putearius is a species of beetle of the family Scarabaeidae. It is found in China (Ningxia, Shanghai, Zhejiang), India, Indonesia (Java), Thailand and Vietnam.

== Description ==
Adults reach a length of about 5.5–7 mm (0.22–0.28 in). They have a strongly convex, glossy, glabrous, black body.
