= Pharaphodius orientalis =

Scientific classification
- Kingdom: Animalia
- Phylum: Arthropoda
- Clade: Pancrustacea
- Class: Insecta
- Order: Coleoptera
- Suborder: Polyphaga
- Infraorder: Scarabaeiformia
- Family: Scarabaeidae
- Genus: Pharaphodius
- Species: P. orientalis

Binomial name
- Pharaphodius orientalis (Harold, 1862)

Synonyms
- Aphodius orientalis Harold, 1862

Species of beetle

Pharaphodius orientalis is a species of beetle of the family Scarabaeidae. It is found in India (Assam), Indonesia (Sunda Islands), Thailand, China (Guangdong), Japan, Nepal and Taiwan.

== Description ==
Adults reach a length of about 4–5 mm (0.16–0.20 in). They have a glossy, glabrous, blackish-brown body. Part of the head and the sides of the pronotum are usually lighter brown.
