= Pharaphodius =

Scientific classification
- Kingdom: Animalia
- Phylum: Arthropoda
- Clade: Pancrustacea
- Class: Insecta
- Order: Coleoptera
- Suborder: Polyphaga
- Infraorder: Scarabaeiformia
- Family: Scarabaeidae
- Tribe: Aphodiini
- Subtribe: Aphodiina
- Genus: Pharaphodius; Reitter, 1892

Synonyms
- Aphodius (Pharaphodius) Reitter, 1892

Genus of beetles

Pharaphodius is a genus of beetles of the family Scarabaeidae.

== Species ==
- Pharaphodius acutidens (Petrovitz, 1964)
- Pharaphodius acutus (Schmidt, 1908)
- Pharaphodius aegyptiacus (Petrovitz, 1964)
- Pharaphodius aprilis (Bordat, 1988)
- Pharaphodius archettii (Müller, 1942)
- Pharaphodius argutus (Schmidt, 1910)
- Pharaphodius atroscutellatus (Schmidt, 1909)
- Pharaphodius attritus (Balthasar, 1933)
- Pharaphodius bechuanus (Petrovitz, 1958)
- Pharaphodius bigibber (Bordat, 1992)
- Pharaphodius birmanicus (Petrovitz, 1965)
- Pharaphodius bodiliformis (Balthasar, 1970)
- Pharaphodius calo (Balthasar, 1971)
- Pharaphodius campestris (Mittal, 1993)
- Pharaphodius chausibensis (Endrödi, 1980)
- Pharaphodius coiffaiti Clément, 1985
- Pharaphodius congolanus (Endrödi, 1964)
- Pharaphodius corax (Balthasar, 1937)
- Pharaphodius cornix (Balthasar, 1933)
- Pharaphodius cornutus (Wiedemann, 1823)
- Pharaphodius costatus (Endrödi, 1964)
- Pharaphodius crenatus (Harold, 1862)
- Pharaphodius curvodilatatus (Schmidt, 1909)
- Pharaphodius desertoides (Endrödi, 1964)
- Pharaphodius desertus (Klug, 1830)
- Pharaphodius diadema (Wiedemann, 1823)
- Pharaphodius difficilis Endrödi, 1955
- Pharaphodius discoidalis (Boheman, 1857)
- Pharaphodius discolor (Erichson, 1842)
- Pharaphodius dubiosus (Péringuey, 1901)
- Pharaphodius dubitosus (Endrödi, 1964)
- Pharaphodius evae (Endrödi, 1973)
- Pharaphodius falzonii (Petrovitz, 1973)
- Pharaphodius ferenczi (Bordat, 1990)
- Pharaphodius ferreirae (Petrovitz, 1971)
- Pharaphodius fiechteri (Balthasar, 1941)
- Pharaphodius guineensis (Klug, 1835)
- Pharaphodius hastulifer (Petrovitz, 1958)
- Pharaphodius hauserianus (Balthasar, 1935)
- Pharaphodius hetaerus (Petrovitz, 1958)
- Pharaphodius impressipennis (Schmidt, 1908)
- Pharaphodius impressithorax (Bordat, 1992)
- Pharaphodius impurus (Roth, 1851)
- Pharaphodius incommodus (Bordat, 1989)
- Pharaphodius indicus (Petrovitz, 1958)
- Pharaphodius infinitus (Schmidt, 1920)
- Pharaphodius intercalaris (Péringuey, 1901)
- Pharaphodius intonsus (Petrovitz, 1964)
- Pharaphodius jodhpurensis (Petrovitz, 1958)
- Pharaphodius katanai (Paulian, 1939)
- Pharaphodius lacunosus (Schmidt, 1910)
- Pharaphodius levithorax (Bordat, 1992)
- Pharaphodius mabiranus (Balthasar, 1933)
- Pharaphodius mangoroensis (Bordat, 1990)
- Pharaphodius marginellus (Fabricius, 1781)
- Pharaphodius massaicus (Gerstaecker, 1884)
- Pharaphodius medius (Schmidt, 1920)
- Pharaphodius moderatus (Petrovitz, 1967)
- Pharaphodius mussooriensis (Mittal, 1993)
- Pharaphodius negus (Petrovitz, 1964)
- Pharaphodius okatumbanus (Balthasar, 1942)
- Pharaphodius oleosus (Harold, 1871)
- Pharaphodius orientalis (Harold, 1862)
- Pharaphodius pallescens (Walker, 1871)
- Pharaphodius paratschakai Clément, 1985
- Pharaphodius parvatia (Mittal, 1993)
- Pharaphodius pereirai (Balthasar, 1955)
- Pharaphodius perfidus (Schmidt, 1908)
- Pharaphodius perplicatus (Bordat, 1996)
- Pharaphodius posticus (Boheman, 1857)
- Pharaphodius priscus (Motschulsky, 1858)
- Pharaphodius profundus (Schmidt, 1911)
- Pharaphodius pseudignotus (Bordat, 1986)
- Pharaphodius pseudodesertus (Bordat, 1996)
- Pharaphodius pseudotibialis (Bordat, 1992)
- Pharaphodius putearius (Reitter, 1895)
- Pharaphodius redargutus (Balthasar, 1971)
- Pharaphodius resplendens (Balthasar, 1941)
- Pharaphodius robustus (Walker, 1858)
- Pharaphodius rougeoti Paulian, 1984
- Pharaphodius rubricosus (Boheman, 1857)
- Pharaphodius rugosostriatus (Waterhouse, 1875)
- Pharaphodius russatus (Erichson, 1842)
- Pharaphodius schatzmayri (Balthasar, 1939)
- Pharaphodius sudanicus (Petrovitz, 1964)
- Pharaphodius sundaicus (Balthasar, 1946)
- Pharaphodius tavetanus Dellacasa, 1983
- Pharaphodius tenerus (Petrovitz, 1959)
- Pharaphodius tschakai (Petrovitz, 1964)
- Pharaphodius ugongoanus (Petrovitz, 1964)
- Pharaphodius unicornis (Petrovitz, 1973)
- Pharaphodius vastus (Petrovitz, 1964)
- Pharaphodius vernilis (Schmidt, 1910)
- Pharaphodius vividus (Petrovitz, 1964)
- Pharaphodius zavattarii (Müller, 1941)
