= Pharaphodius rugosostriatus =

Scientific classification
- Kingdom: Animalia
- Phylum: Arthropoda
- Clade: Pancrustacea
- Class: Insecta
- Order: Coleoptera
- Suborder: Polyphaga
- Infraorder: Scarabaeiformia
- Family: Scarabaeidae
- Genus: Pharaphodius
- Species: P. rugosostriatus

Binomial name
- Pharaphodius rugosostriatus (Waterhouse, 1875)

Synonyms
- Aphodius rugosostriatus Waterhouse, 1875; Aphodius (Pharaphodius) raddei Berlov, 1989; Aphodius (Pseudacrossus) juxtus Petrovitz, 1972

Species of beetle

Pharaphodius rugosostriatus is a species of beetle of the family Scarabaeidae. It is found in China (Anhui, Beijing, Fujian, Gansu, Guangdong, Guangxi, Guizhou, Hainan, Hebei, Heilongjiang, Henan, Hubei, Hunan, Jiangxi, Jilin, Liaoning, Nei Mongol, Ningxia, Shaanxi, Shanghai, Shanxi, Sichuan, Tianjin, Yunnan, Zhejiang), Japan, Korea, the Russian Far East and Taiwan.

== Description ==
Adults reach a length of about 5.5–7 mm (0.22–0.28 in). They have a moderately convex, glossy, glabrous, dark reddish-brown body, with the anterior margin of the head and the sides of the pronotum lighter. The disc of the pronotum is dark brown.

== Life history ==
Specimens have been collected from cow, horse and deer dung.
