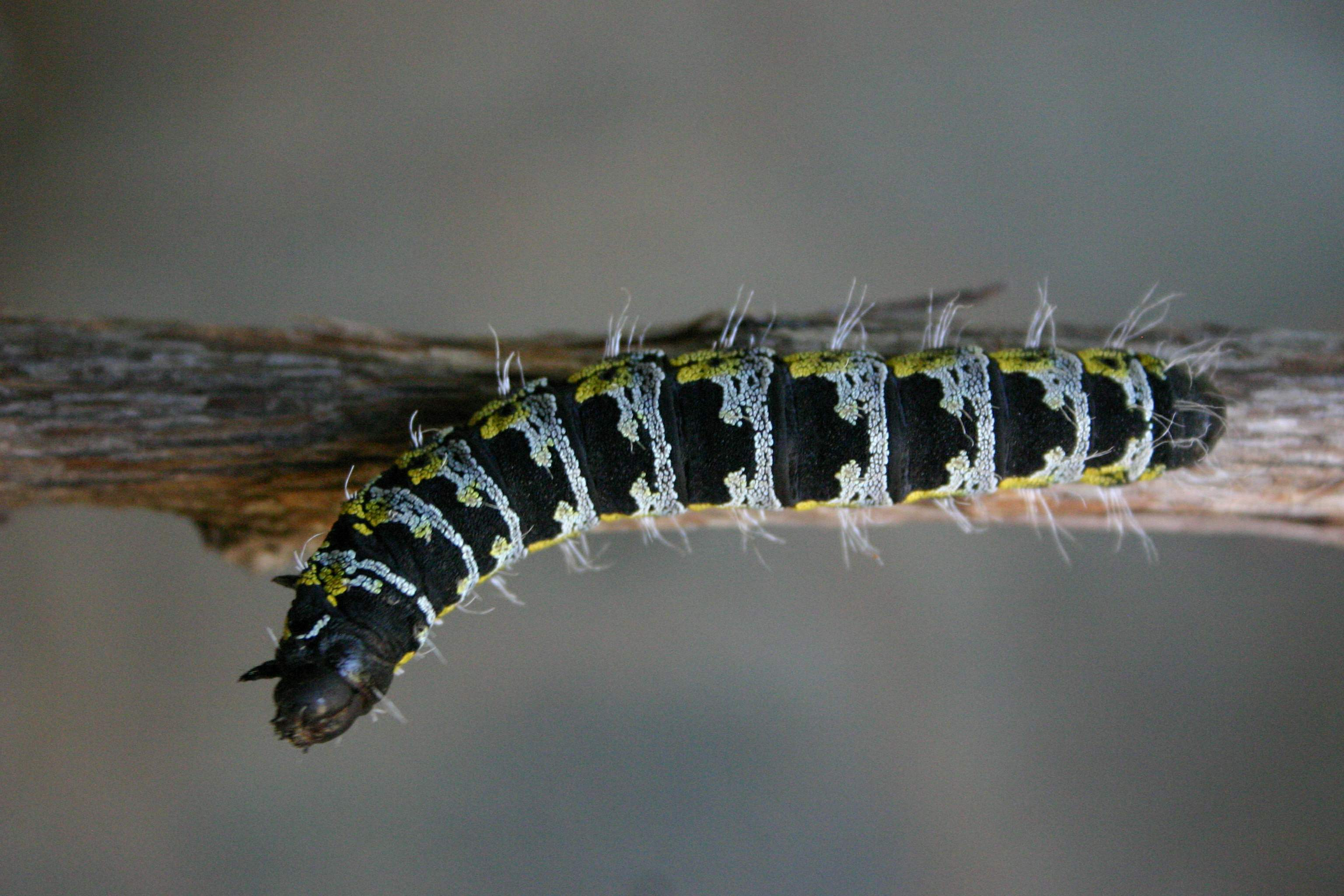
- Caterpillar of Cirina forda

Scientific classification
- Kingdom: Animalia
- Phylum: Arthropoda
- Class: Insecta
- Order: Lepidoptera
- Family: Saturniidae
- Tribe: Bunaeini
- Genus: Cirina; Walker, 1855

= Cirina =

Genus of moths

Cirina is a genus of moths in the family Saturniidae.

== Species ==
- Cirina butyrospermi (Vuillet, 1911)
- Cirina forda (Westwood, 1849)
