= Pachnessa vietnamica =

Scientific classification
- Kingdom: Animalia
- Phylum: Arthropoda
- Clade: Pancrustacea
- Class: Insecta
- Order: Coleoptera
- Suborder: Polyphaga
- Infraorder: Scarabaeiformia
- Family: Scarabaeidae
- Genus: Pachnessa
- Species: P. vietnamica

Binomial name
- Pachnessa vietnamica Keith, 2009

Species of beetle

Pachnessa vietnamica is a species of beetle of the family Scarabaeidae. It is found in Vietnam.

== Description ==
Adults reach a length of about 12 mm. They have an elongated, sub-parallel, entirely blackish body, with the forebody darker than the elytra and the appendages and underside slightly lighter.

== Etymology ==
The species name refers to the country of origin.
