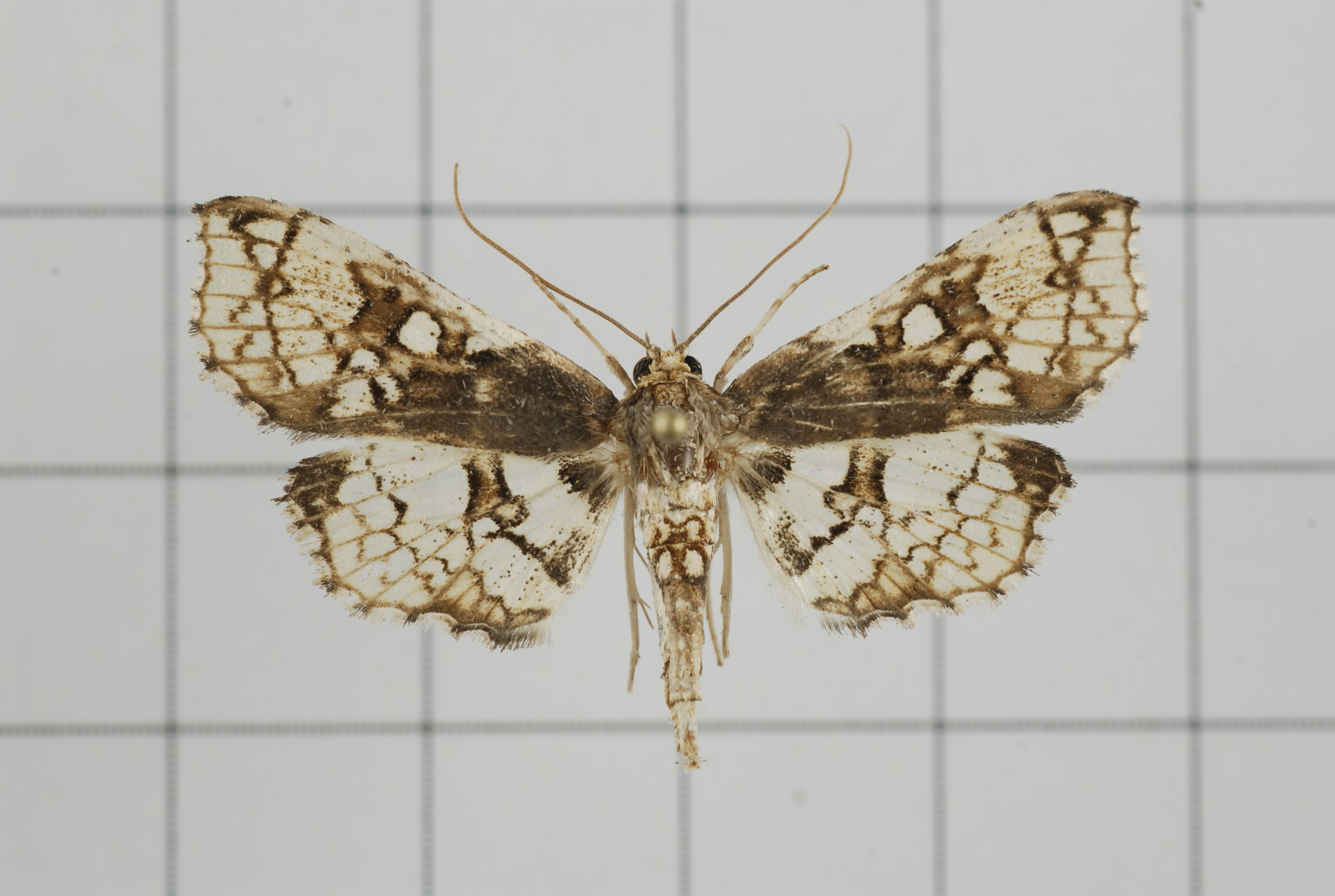

Scientific classification
- Kingdom: Animalia
- Phylum: Arthropoda
- Class: Insecta
- Order: Lepidoptera
- Family: Crambidae
- Genus: Omphisa
- Species: O. anastomosalis

Binomial name
- Omphisa anastomosalis (Guenee, in Boisduval and Guenee, 1854)

Synonyms
- Pionea anastomosalis Guenee, in Boisduval and Guenee, 1854; Evergistis anastomosalis

= Omphisa anastomosalis =

Sweetpotato vineborer

Species of moth

Omphisa anastomosalis, the sweetpotato vineborer, is a moth of the family Crambidae. It is widespread, with records including the Philippines, Indonesia, New Guinea, India, Sri Lanka, Malaysia, Taiwan, Hawaii, Vietnam, China, Japan, Cambodia, Laos, Burma and Thailand.

The wingspan is about 33 mm.
