= Pharaphodius perfidus =

Scientific classification
- Kingdom: Animalia
- Phylum: Arthropoda
- Clade: Pancrustacea
- Class: Insecta
- Order: Coleoptera
- Suborder: Polyphaga
- Infraorder: Scarabaeiformia
- Family: Scarabaeidae
- Genus: Pharaphodius
- Species: P. perfidus

Binomial name
- Pharaphodius perfidus (Schmidt, 1908)

Synonyms
- Aphodius perfidus Schmidt, 1908

Species of beetle

Pharaphodius perfidus is a species of beetle of the family Scarabaeidae. It is found in India (Karnataka).

== Description ==
Adults reach a length of about 4 mm (0.16 in). They have a glossy, strongly convex, dark reddish-brown to blackish-brown body, with light reddish-brown legs.
