= Omphisa robusta =

Scientific classification
- Kingdom: Animalia
- Phylum: Arthropoda
- Class: Insecta
- Order: Lepidoptera
- Family: Crambidae
- Subfamily: Spilomelinae
- Tribe: Margaroniini
- Genus: Omphisa
- Species: O. robusta

Binomial name
- Omphisa robusta Janse, 1928

Species of moth

Omphisa robusta is a moth in the family Crambidae. It was described by Anthonie Johannes Theodorus Janse in 1928. It is found on New Guinea.
