= Omphisa illisalis =

Scientific classification
- Kingdom: Animalia
- Phylum: Arthropoda
- Class: Insecta
- Order: Lepidoptera
- Family: Crambidae
- Subfamily: Spilomelinae
- Tribe: Margaroniini
- Genus: Omphisa
- Species: O. illisalis

Binomial name
- Omphisa illisalis (Walker, 1859)

Synonyms
- Botys illisalis Walker, 1859

Species of moth

Omphisa illisalis is a moth in the family Crambidae. It was described by Francis Walker in 1859. It is found in Sri Lanka and India.
