= Omphisa vaovao =

Scientific classification
- Kingdom: Animalia
- Phylum: Arthropoda
- Class: Insecta
- Order: Lepidoptera
- Family: Crambidae
- Subfamily: Spilomelinae
- Tribe: Margaroniini
- Genus: Omphisa
- Species: O. vaovao

Binomial name
- Omphisa vaovao Viette, 1973

Species of moth

Omphisa vaovao is a moth in the family Crambidae. It was described by Viette in 1973. It is found in Madagascar.
