= Omphisa repetitalis =

Scientific classification
- Kingdom: Animalia
- Phylum: Arthropoda
- Class: Insecta
- Order: Lepidoptera
- Family: Crambidae
- Subfamily: Spilomelinae
- Tribe: Margaroniini
- Genus: Omphisa
- Species: O. repetitalis

Binomial name
- Omphisa repetitalis Snellen, 1890

Species of moth

Omphisa repetitalis is a moth in the family Crambidae. It was described by Snellen in 1890. It is found in India (Sikkim).
