= Pharaphodius pereirai =

Scientific classification
- Kingdom: Animalia
- Phylum: Arthropoda
- Clade: Pancrustacea
- Class: Insecta
- Order: Coleoptera
- Suborder: Polyphaga
- Infraorder: Scarabaeiformia
- Family: Scarabaeidae
- Genus: Pharaphodius
- Species: P. pereirai

Binomial name
- Pharaphodius pereirai (Balthasar, 1955)

Synonyms
- Aphodius (Pharaphodius) pereirai Balthasar, 1955

Species of beetle

Pharaphodius pereirai is a species of beetle of the family Scarabaeidae. It is found in Afghanistan, Nepal and Pakistan.

== Description ==
Adults reach a length of about 5.5–7 mm (0.22–0.28 in). They have an elongate, subparallel, robust, strongly convex, shining, black body. The legs and antennae are yellowish-brown.
