= Pharaphodius crenatus =

Scientific classification
- Kingdom: Animalia
- Phylum: Arthropoda
- Clade: Pancrustacea
- Class: Insecta
- Order: Coleoptera
- Suborder: Polyphaga
- Infraorder: Scarabaeiformia
- Family: Scarabaeidae
- Genus: Pharaphodius
- Species: P. crenatus

Binomial name
- Pharaphodius crenatus (Harold, 1862)

Synonyms
- Aphodius crenatus Harold, 1862

Species of beetle

Pharaphodius crenatus is a species of dung beetle native to Taiwan, Nepal, India (Himachal Pradesh, Uttarakhand, Andaman, Chhattisgarh, Haryana, Madhya Pradesh, Uttar Pradesh), Indonesia (Java), the Philippines, Sri Lanka, Thailand and Vietnam.

== Description ==
Adults reach a length of about 6–7.5 mm (0.24–0.30 in). They have a glossy, glabrous, strongly convex, black to blackish-brown body.

== Edibility ==
It is an edible type of beetle consumed in Thailand.
