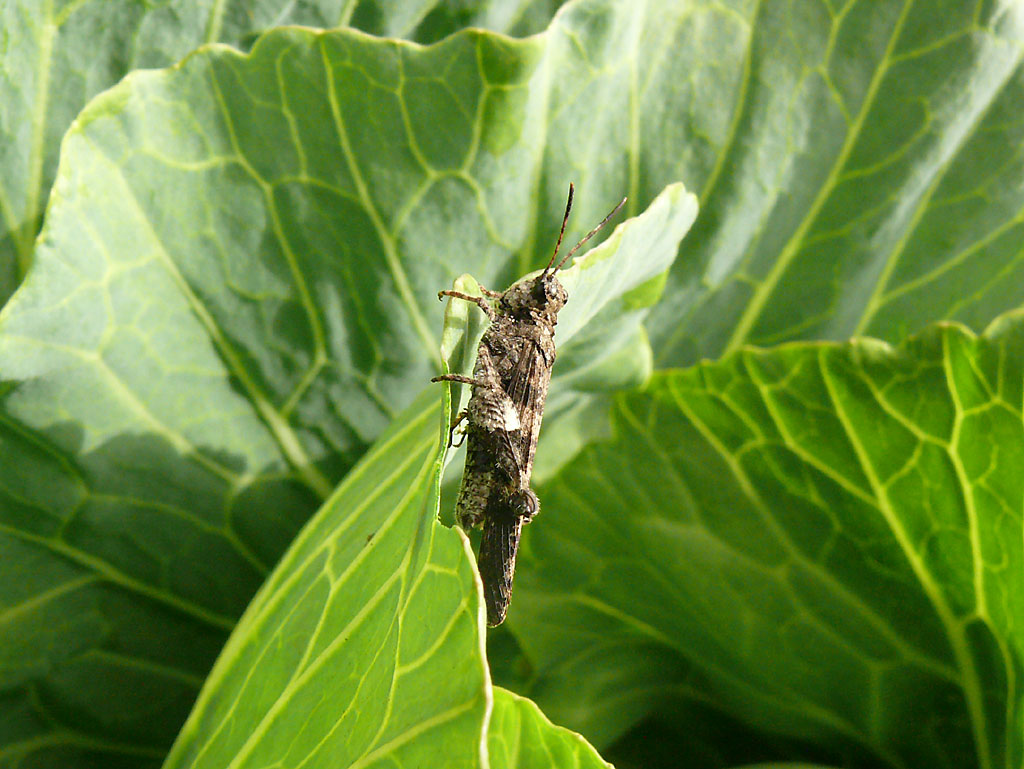
- Trilophidia conturbata

Scientific classification
- Domain: Eukaryota
- Kingdom: Animalia
- Phylum: Arthropoda
- Class: Insecta
- Order: Orthoptera
- Suborder: Caelifera
- Family: Acrididae
- Subfamily: Oedipodinae
- Tribe: Trilophidiini; Shumakov, 1963
- Genus: Trilophidia; Stål, 1873

= Trilophidia =

Genus of grasshoppers

Trilophidia is a genus of grasshoppers in the family Acrididae, subfamily Oedipodinae and the only member of the tribe Trilophidiini. The recorded distribution of species is from Africa and the middle-East through to Japan and Malesia.

== Species ==
The Orthoptera Species File lists:

1. Trilophidia annulata Thunberg, 1815 - type species (as Oedipoda cristella Stål; synonym T. japonica Saussure, 1888)
2. Trilophidia burtti Hollis, 1965
3. Trilophidia cinnabarina Brancsik, 1893
4. Trilophidia conturbata Walker, 1870
5. Trilophidia namibica La Greca, 1991
6. Trilophidia parvula Popov, 1985
7. Trilophidia repleta Walker, 1870
8. Trilophidia turpis (Walker, 1870)

== Gallery ==
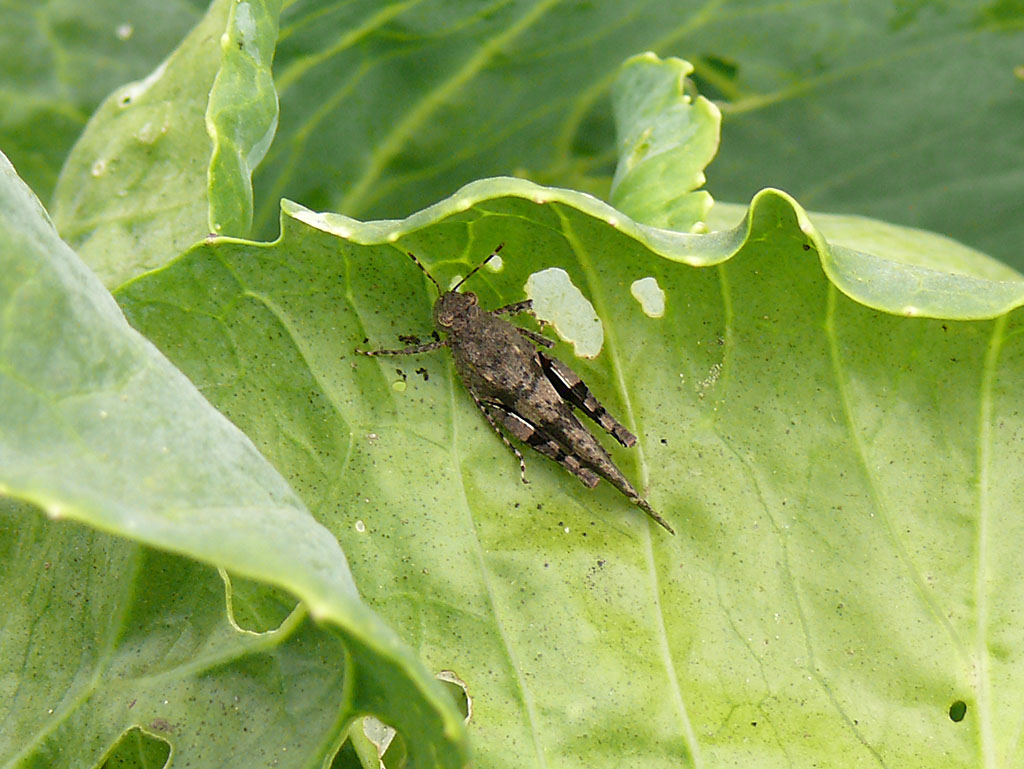
T. conturbata

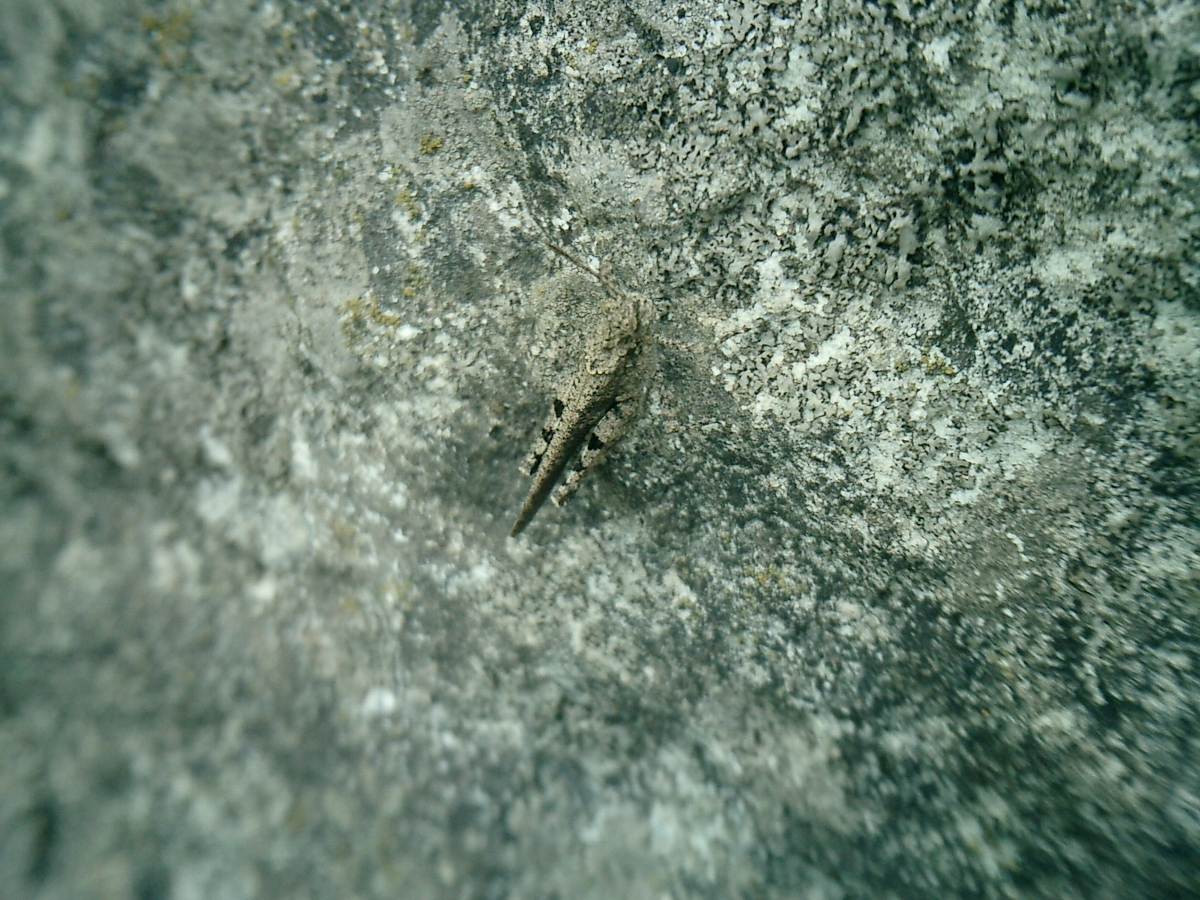
T. annulata
