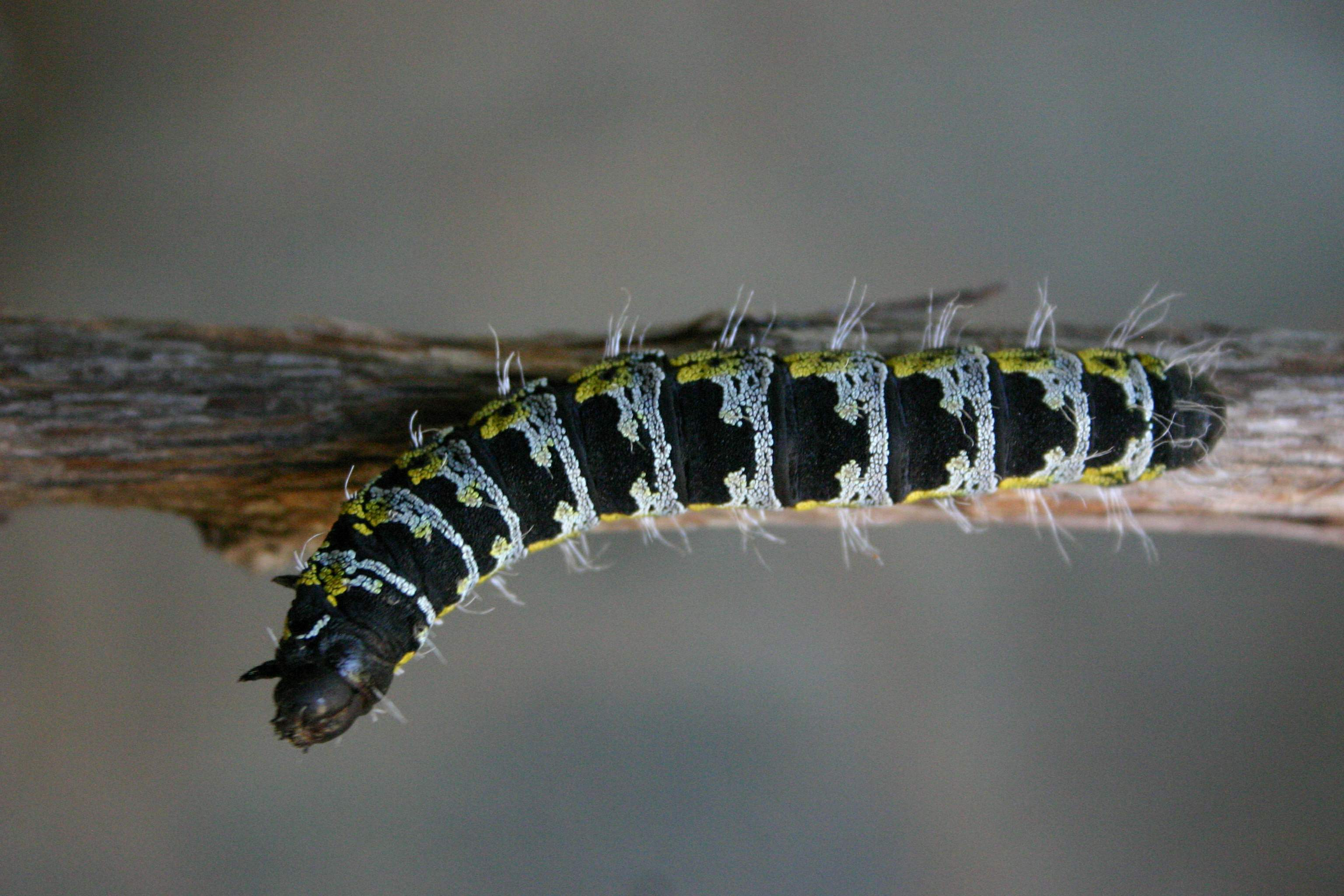

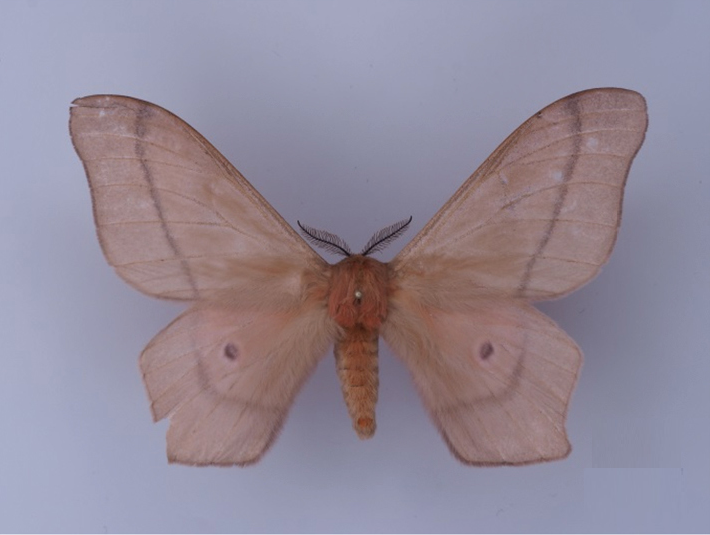
- Caterpillar and male imago

Scientific classification
- Kingdom: Animalia
- Phylum: Arthropoda
- Class: Insecta
- Order: Lepidoptera
- Family: Saturniidae
- Genus: Cirina
- Species: C. forda

Binomial name
- Cirina forda (Westwood, 1849)

Synonyms
- Saturnia forda Westwood, 1849; Perisomena semicaeca Walker, 1855

= Cirina forda =

Pallid emperor moth

Species of moth

Cirina forda, the pallid emperor moth or shea defoliator, is a moth of the family Saturniidae. The species was first described by John O. Westwood in 1849. It is found in western Africa, including Ghana, Nigeria, Zimbabwe, the Democratic Republic of the Congo and South Africa.

Adults are pale creamy brown with a small darker spot on each hindwing but lacking true eyespots. There is one generation per year.

The larvae feed on Vitellaria paradoxa. They may cause heavy defoliation in Ghana and Nigeria. In South Africa the favoured food plant is the tree Burkea africana.

The larvae are consumed (entomophagy) in Nigeria.

Pupation takes place in soft soil or sand at the base of the host plant.
