= Omphisa variegata =

Scientific classification
- Kingdom: Animalia
- Phylum: Arthropoda
- Class: Insecta
- Order: Lepidoptera
- Family: Crambidae
- Subfamily: Spilomelinae
- Tribe: Margaroniini
- Genus: Omphisa
- Species: O. variegata

Binomial name
- Omphisa variegata Kenrick, 1912

Species of moth

Omphisa variegata is a moth in the family Crambidae. It was described by George Hamilton Kenrick in 1912. It is found on New Guinea.
