= Omphisa =

Scientific classification
- Kingdom: Animalia
- Phylum: Arthropoda
- Clade: Pancrustacea
- Class: Insecta
- Order: Lepidoptera
- Family: Crambidae
- Tribe: Margaroniini
- Genus: Omphisa; Moore, 1886

Genus of moths

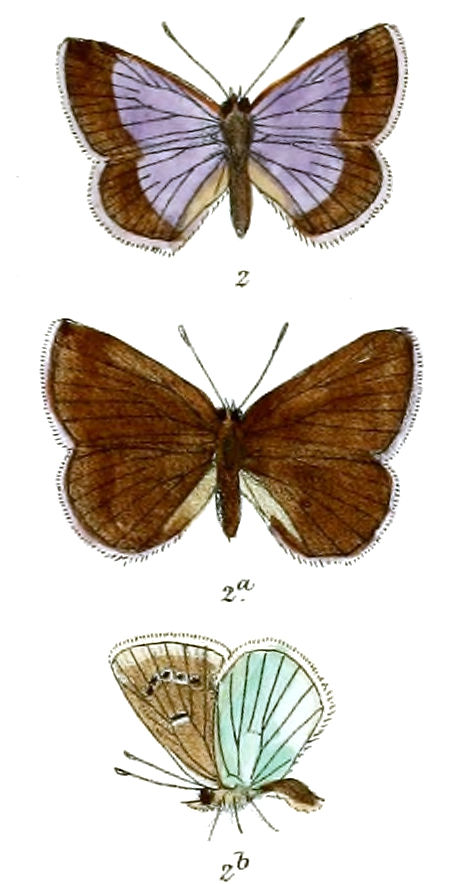
Albulina omphisae (male, female, male underside).

Omphisa is a genus of moths of the family Crambidae described by Frederic Moore in 1886.

== Species ==
- Omphisa anastomosalis (Guenée, 1854)
- Omphisa caustalis Hampson, 1913
- Omphisa fuscidentalis (Hampson, 1896)
- Omphisa illisalis (Walker, 1859)
- Omphisa leucostolalis Hampson, 1918
- Omphisa repetitalis Snellen, 1890
- Omphisa robusta Janse, 1928
- Omphisa vaovao Viette, 1973
- Omphisa variegata Kenrick, 1912

== Former species ==
- Omphisa ingens Hampson, 1899
