= Pachnessa smetsi =

Scientific classification
- Kingdom: Animalia
- Phylum: Arthropoda
- Clade: Pancrustacea
- Class: Insecta
- Order: Coleoptera
- Suborder: Polyphaga
- Infraorder: Scarabaeiformia
- Family: Scarabaeidae
- Genus: Pachnessa
- Species: P. smetsi

Binomial name
- Pachnessa smetsi Keith, 2009

Species of beetle

Pachnessa smetsi is a species of beetle of the family Scarabaeidae. It is found in Cambodia.

== Description ==
Adults reach a length of about 13.6 mm. They have an elongate body. The head is dark brown, and the pronotum has a central band in the shape of a dark brown cross and is very broad yellowish brown laterally. The elytra are black except for the yellowish-brown basal quarter. The antennae and underside are also yellowish-brown. The entire upper surface has a distinct pruinose veil on the pronotum and elytra.

== Etymology ==
The species is named after one of its collectors, P. Smets.
