= Cirina butyrospermi =

Scientific classification
- Kingdom: Animalia
- Phylum: Arthropoda
- Clade: Pancrustacea
- Class: Insecta
- Order: Lepidoptera
- Family: Saturniidae
- Subfamily: Saturniinae
- Tribe: Bunaeini
- Genus: Cirina
- Species: C. butyrospermi

Binomial name
- Cirina butyrospermi Vuillet, 1911

Species of moth

Cirina butyrospermi is a species of moth of the family Saturniidae described by André Vuillet in 1911.

The caterpillar of C. butyrospermi, known as 'chitoumou', is eaten as source of protein in West Africa. They feed exclusively on the leaves of the shea tree (Vitellaria paradoxa), which is widely cultivated in the region for the production of shea butter, as well as traditional medicines and other goods. The caterpillars can be eaten raw, dried or fried.

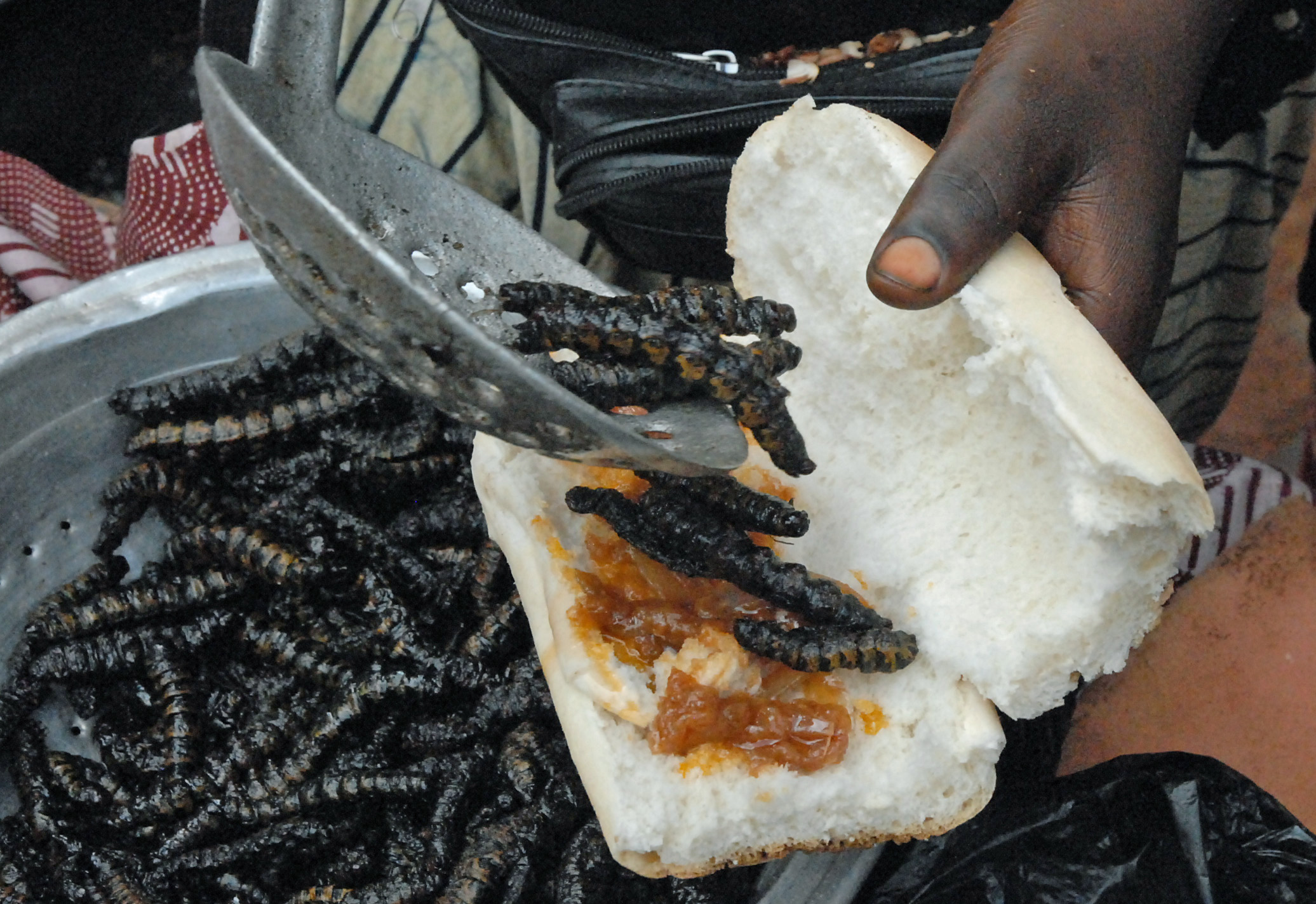
A sandwich with fried shea tree caterpillars at the Boromo bus station in Burkina Faso.
