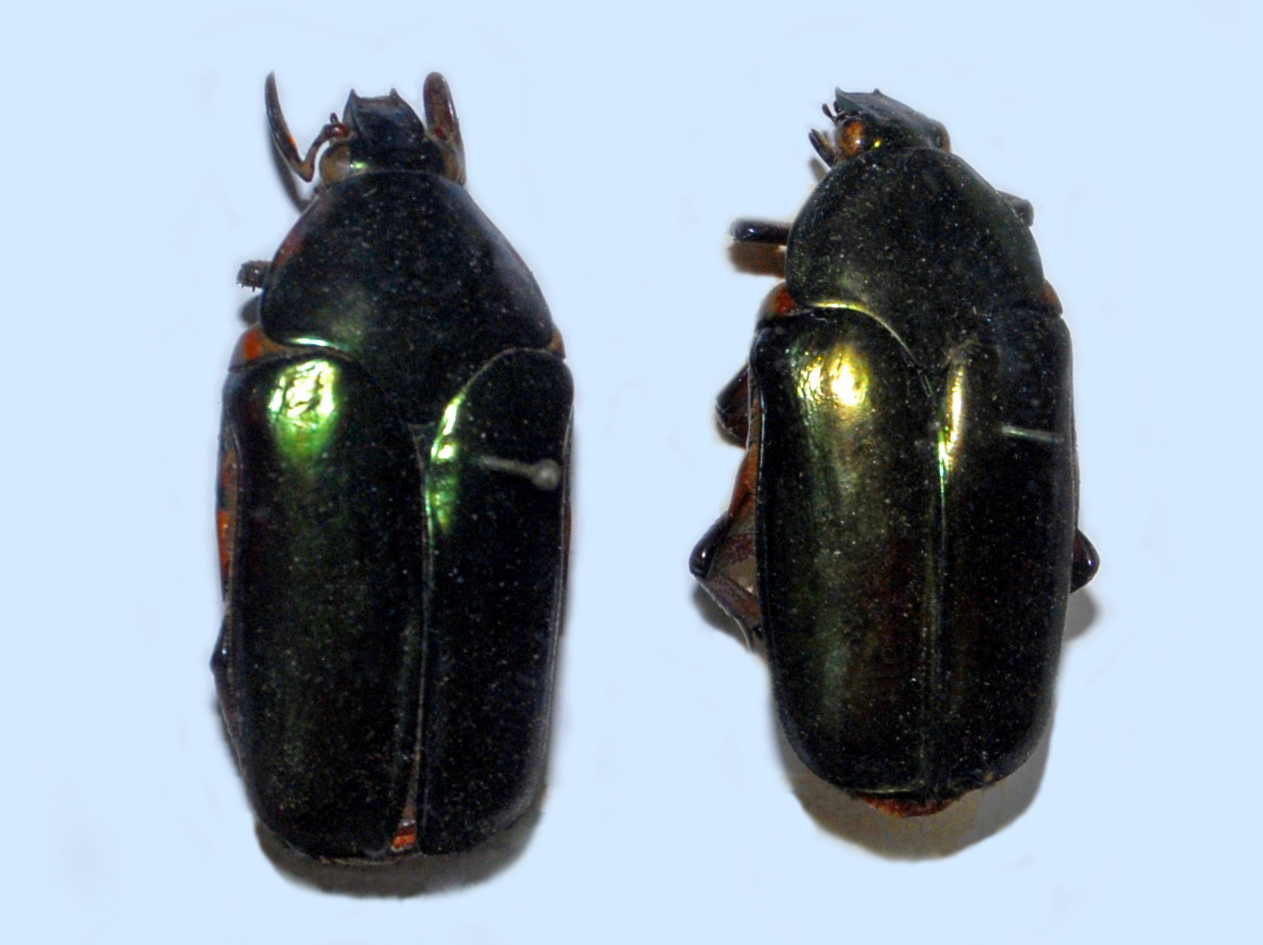
- Museum specimen

Scientific classification
- Kingdom: Animalia
- Phylum: Arthropoda
- Clade: Pancrustacea
- Class: Insecta
- Order: Coleoptera
- Suborder: Polyphaga
- Infraorder: Scarabaeiformia
- Family: Scarabaeidae
- Genus: Agestrata
- Species: A. orichalca

Binomial name
- Agestrata orichalca (Linnaeus, 1769)

= Agestrata orichalca =

Species of beetle

Agestrata orichalca is a species of beetles of the family Scarabaeidae.

== Description ==
Agestrata orichalca can reach a length of about 55–60 millimetres (2.2–2.4 in). Body of these beetles is broad, oblong, a little flat and the basic color is shiny, metallic green.

== Distribution ==
This species can be found in South-eastern Asia (Northern India, Sri Lanka, China, Thailand, Vietnam, Sulawesi, Flores Isl., Komodo Isl., Lombok Isl.).
