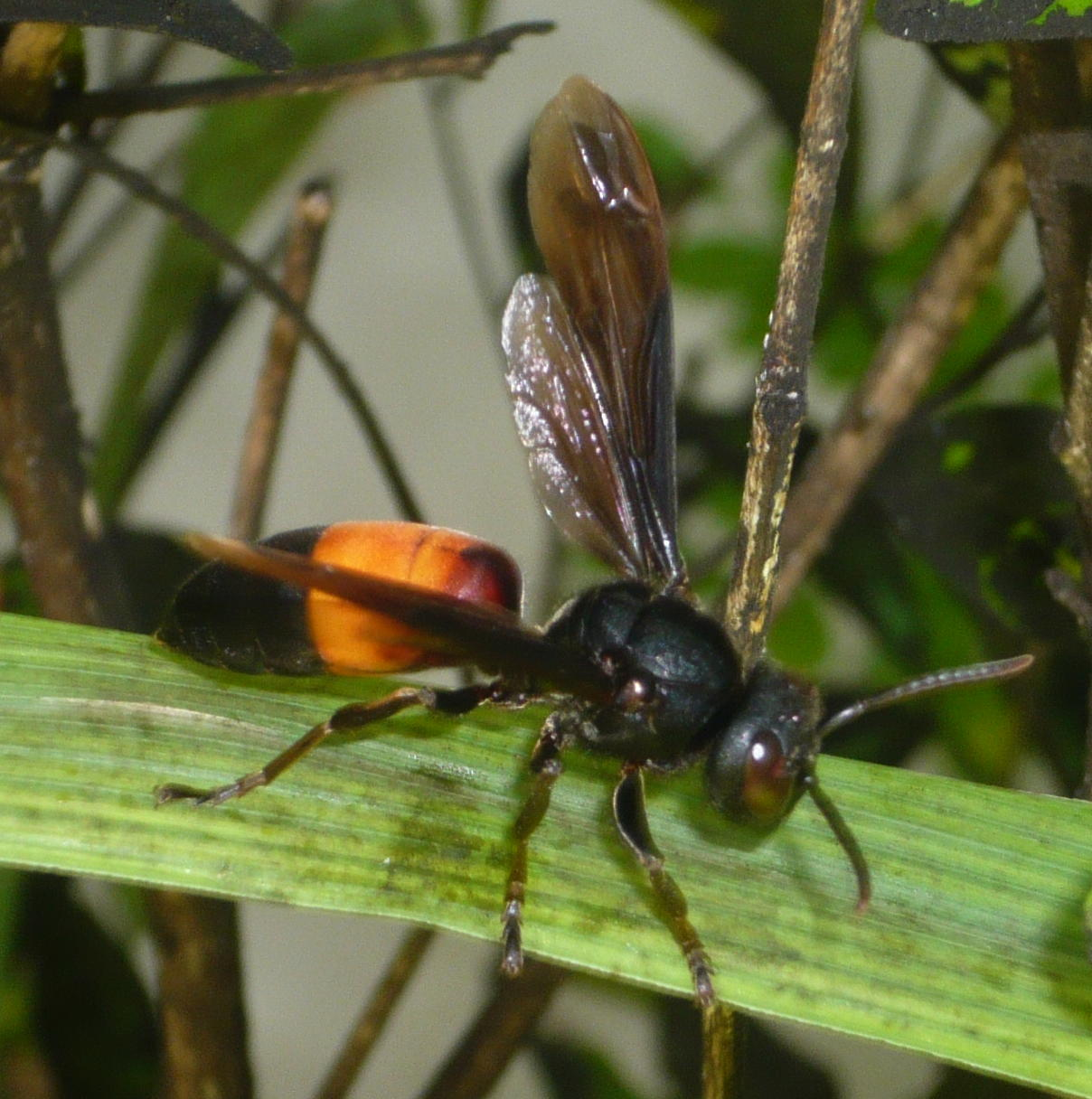
- Vespa affinis

Scientific classification
- Kingdom: Animalia
- Phylum: Arthropoda
- Clade: Pancrustacea
- Class: Insecta
- Order: Hymenoptera
- Family: Vespidae
- Genus: Vespa
- Species: V. affinis

Binomial name
- Vespa affinis Linnaeus, 1764

Synonyms
- Apis affinis Linnaeus, 1764

= Vespa affinis =

Lesser banded hornet

Species of hornet

Vespa affinis, the lesser banded hornet, is a common hornet in tropical and subtropical Asia.

== Description ==
The lesser banded hornet is a small to medium-sized hornet, with queens reaching up to 30 mm, males 26 mm and workers averaging 22 to 25 mm.

The head is brownish red or black, pubescent, with some red markings on frons and vertex, black temple; compound eyes and ocelli black; dark brown antennae and usually pale brown underneath; black clypeus, coarsely punctate, posterior side of clypeus with broadly rounded lobes; mandibles and tooth black. Thorax black with many punctures and some erected hairs, propodeum black. Legs dark brown. Wings dark fuscous brown, tegulae dark brown. Gaster with some fine punctures, dark brown segments except first and second segments yellowish orange. In some specimens, the yellowish orange on the first tergite may be reduced to two transverse spots and a narrow apical band.

There are many color variants across the range of the species, originally considered subspecies but no longer recognized; while there is a history of recognizing subspecies within many of the Vespa hornets, the most recent taxonomic revision of the genus treats all subspecific names in the genus Vespa as synonyms, effectively relegating them to no more than informal names for regional color forms. In Hong Kong and South China the wasps are mainly black, with the first two abdominal segments being a deep yellow, forming a conspicuous band. The sides of the head and thorax display some reddish brown. In Southeast Asian regions such as Singapore they are fully black, without reddish brown markings, and the abdominal band is a brilliant orange.

== Distribution ==
The lesser banded hornet is widespread throughout tropical and subtropical Asia. It is found in Sri Lanka, Hong Kong, Taiwan, Burma, Thailand, Laos, Vietnam, Cambodia, Indonesia, the Philippines (Palawan), Singapore and Malaysia.

== Behaviour ==
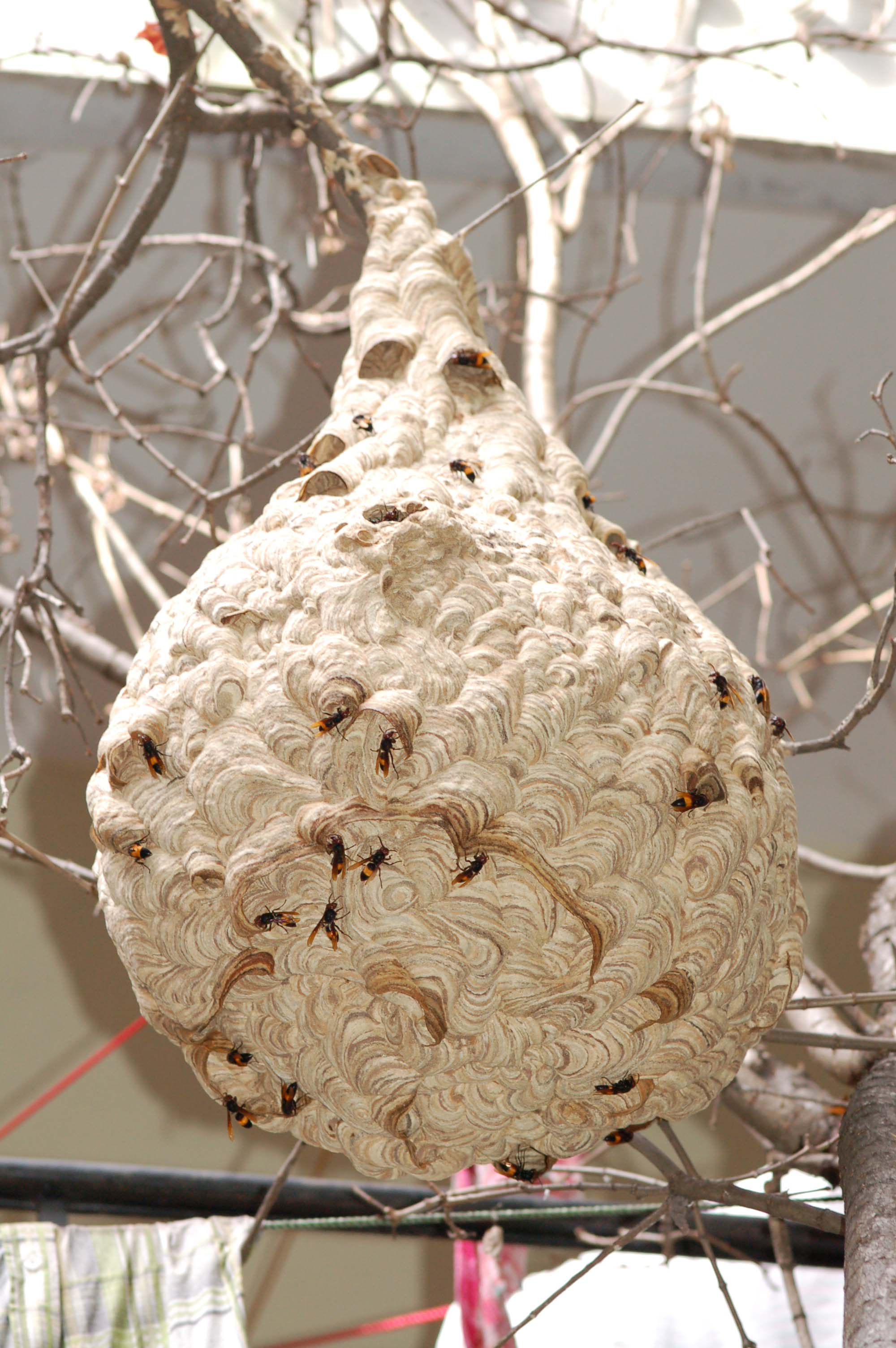
A V. affinis nest in Bangalore

Vespa affinis forages close to the ground in grassy areas, forest and wasteland. It has a versatile diet of both carbohydrates such as tree sap, nectar, fruits and larvae saliva and proteinaceous food such as carrion, paper wasps (Polistinae) and bees (Apidae)). Its diet is mainly composed of liquid foods such as nectar from flowers. It also eats bees and collects meat from freshly dead insects. In Singapore it preys on flies attracted to carrion.

The nest of Vespa affinis are built high in trees, but also low in shrubs as well as on houses. Nests built in high trees are generally elongated. In tropical areas the nest is pear-shaped or drop-shaped, but in subtropical regions it is oval with a rounded top. Small nests are ball shaped with a side entrance while larger nests are vertically elongated and may have multiple entrances. The nests have an imbricate envelope with many individual overlapping circular layers of papering. It can reach more than 60 cm in length in tropical regions.

Vespa affinis has gained notoriety in Indonesia for its aggressive behavior and powerful sting, which has a potential for causing a life-threatening anaphylaxis. In 2018, it is reported that seven people died from V. affinis stings.

== Life cycle ==
In subtropical Hong Kong, the queens awake from hibernation in April and the colony usually dies in late November or December. In tropical areas, it remains present all year. In tropical areas, the lesser banded hornet is known for multiple queen founding and swarm founding (pleometrosis), where several queens or multiple queens with a swarm of workers from the old nest start a new one together.

== Sources ==
- Harris, A.C.; Patrick, B.H. 1997: A large queen Asian hornet (Vespa affinis; Hymenoptera: Vespidae) captured live in Arrowtown. Weta, 20: 9–13. PDF
- Nguyen, L.T.P.; F. Saito; J.I. Kojima & J.M. Carpenter, 2006, Vespidae of Viet Nam (Insecta: Hymenoptera) 2. Taxonomic Notes on Vespinae. Zoological Science 23: 95–104. (PDF)
- “Vespa affinis (Linnaeus, 1764) Lesser banded hornet”, Wikispaces Classroom article on https://taxo4254.wikispaces.com/8.2. Accessed on 01.10.2017.
- “Vespa affinis”, Wikispecies article on https://species.wikimedia.org/wiki/Vespa_affinis. Accessed on 01.10.2017.
- “Vespa affinis (Linnaeus, 1764)”, at http://www.hornissenschutz.de/vespa_affinis_engl.htm. Accessed on 01.10.2017.
- “Vespa affinis” at http://www.vespa-bicolor.net/main/vespid/vespa-affinis.htm. Accessed on 01.10.2017.
- “Vespa affinis Common Tiger-wasp”. Encyclopedia of Life (EOL) on phttp://eol.org/pages/259323/overview. Accessed on 01.10.2017.
