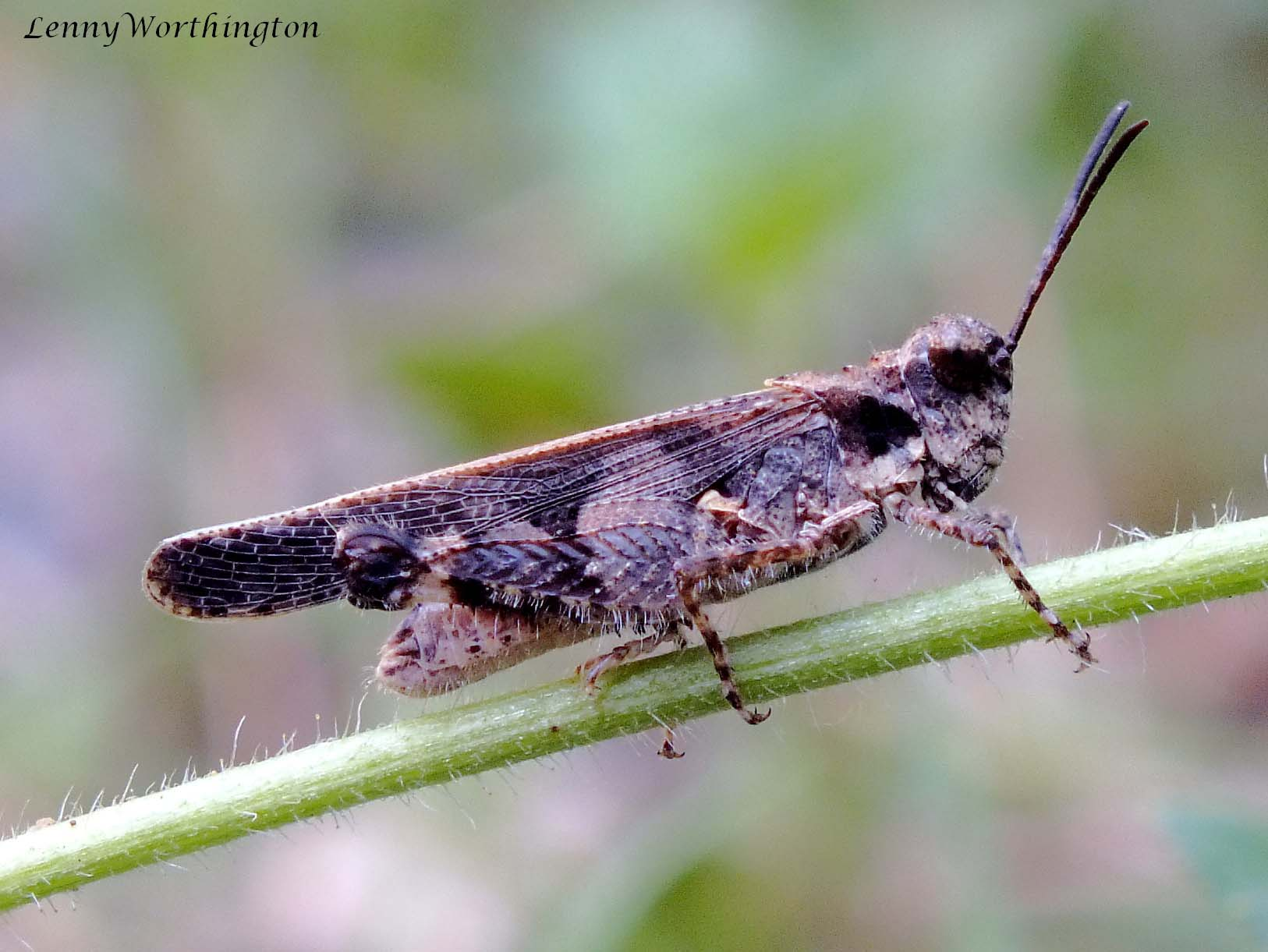
- Trilophidia annulata, Thailand

Scientific classification
- Kingdom: Animalia
- Phylum: Arthropoda
- Clade: Pancrustacea
- Class: Insecta
- Order: Orthoptera
- Suborder: Caelifera
- Family: Acrididae
- Subfamily: Oedipodinae
- Tribe: Trilophidiini
- Genus: Trilophidia
- Species: T. annulata

Binomial name
- Trilophidia annulata (Thunberg, 1815)

= Trilophidia annulata =

Species of band-winged grasshopper

Trilophidia annulata is a species of band-winged grasshopper in the family Acrididae. It is found in Asia.
