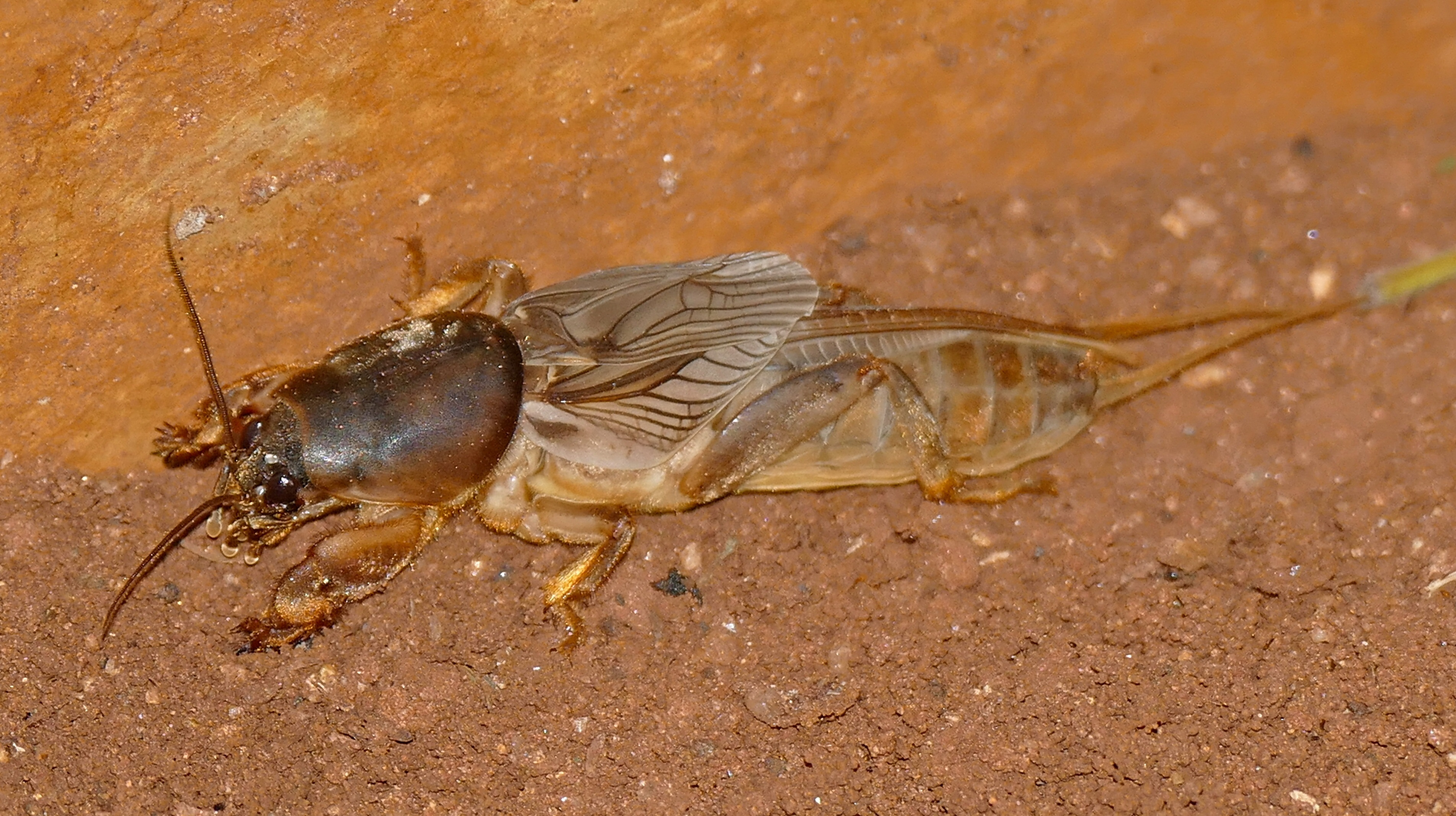

Scientific classification
- Kingdom: Animalia
- Phylum: Arthropoda
- Clade: Pancrustacea
- Class: Insecta
- Order: Orthoptera
- Suborder: Ensifera
- Family: Gryllotalpidae
- Genus: Gryllotalpa
- Species: G. africana

Binomial name
- Gryllotalpa africana (Palisot de Beauvois, 1805)

= Gryllotalpa africana =

Species of cricket-like animal

Gryllotalpa africana, also known as the African mole cricket, is a relatively small mole cricket species, native to Africa, but local populations exist in Asia, and southern Europe.

== Subspecies and similar species ==
It is now understood that G. africana is a species complex that may include cryptic species. These cryptic species can be distinguished only by their song patterns. There are two subspecies of G. africana; the Orthoptera Species File lists:

- Gryllotalpa africana Palisot de Beauvois, 1805
  - G. africana africana Palisot de Beauvois, 1805 (Africa, Portugal, Indian Subcontinent)
  - G. africana microphtalma Chopard, 1936 (Senegal)
- Gryllotalpa bulla Townsend, 1983
- Gryllotalpa debilis Gerstaecker, 1869
- Gryllotalpa devia Saussure, 1877
- Gryllotalpa robusta Townsend, 1983
- Gryllotalpa rufescens Chopard, 1948

== Biology ==
The species is omnivorous. The mole cricket lives underground, making burrows and feeding on plant roots, larvae and other insects. It goes to the surface only at night - mostly in the mating season. It can fly too, when changing territory or when females are searching for males. Males call females by chirping. This cricket is considered a pest in some regions.
