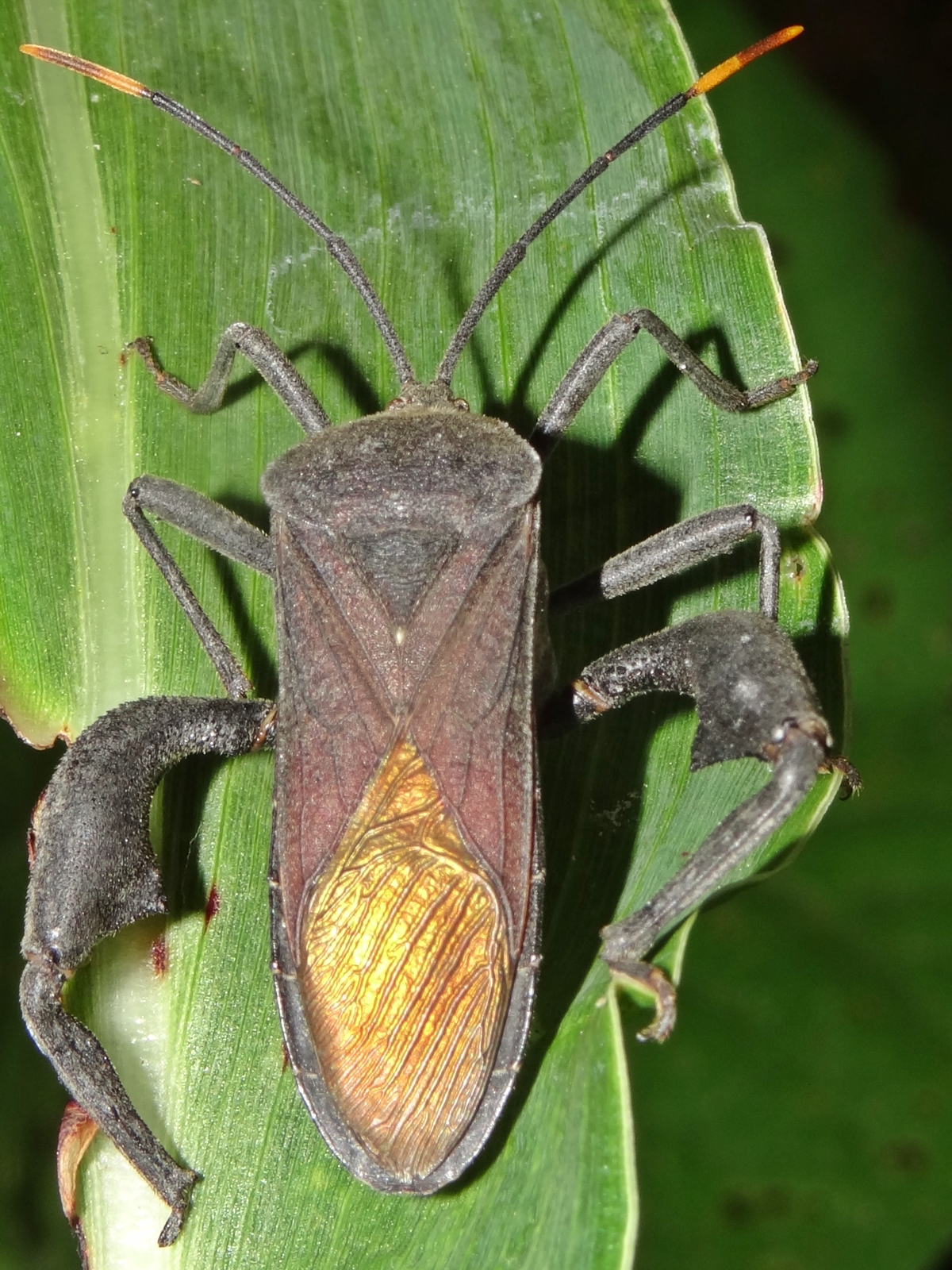

Scientific classification
- Domain: Eukaryota
- Kingdom: Animalia
- Phylum: Arthropoda
- Class: Insecta
- Order: Hemiptera
- Suborder: Heteroptera
- Family: Coreidae
- Genus: Anoplocnemis
- Species: A. phasiana

Binomial name
- Anoplocnemis phasiana (Fabricius, 1781)

= Anoplocnemis phasiana =

Species of true bug

Anoplocnemis phasiana is a species of sap-sucking insect in the family Coreidae. They are native to Asia where they are considered a major pest of many types of agricultural plants such as trees and shrubs, including legumes, sometimes known as the tip-withering bug.
