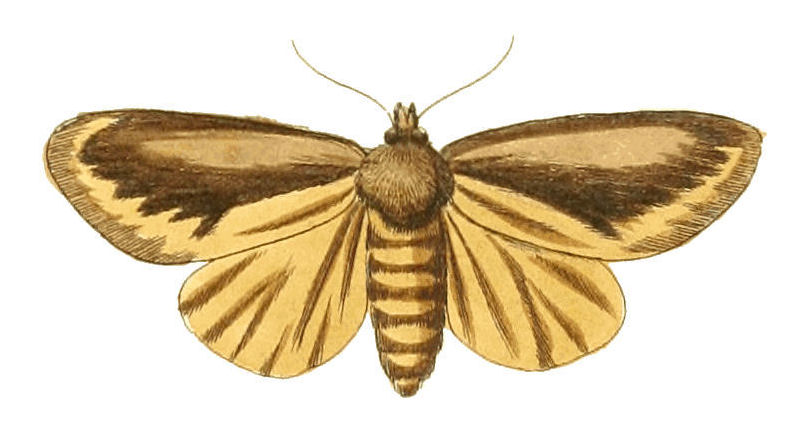
- Dorsal view

Scientific classification
- Kingdom: Animalia
- Phylum: Arthropoda
- Class: Insecta
- Order: Lepidoptera
- Superfamily: Noctuoidea
- Family: Notodontidae
- Genus: Tifama; Walker, 1855
- Species: T. chera

Binomial name
- Tifama chera (Drury, 1773)

Synonyms
- Chaetognatha Felder, 1874; Noctua chera Drury, 1773; Lusura chera (Drury, 1773); Phalaena altrix Stoll, [1780]; Phalaena megalops Sepp, 1848; Tifama simois Walker, 1855

= Tifama =

Genus of moths

Tifama is a monotypic moth genus in the family Notodontidae (the prominent moths) erected by Francis Walker in 1855. Its only species, Tifama chera, was first described by Dru Drury in 1773. The species is known to occur in Suriname and Brazil.

== Description ==
Upperside: antennae setaceous (bristly). Head, thorax, and abdomen greyish russet. Wings grey-ash coloured, the anterior having a dark brown irregular line running near the posterior and external edges to the anterior near the tips. Posterior wings immaculate. Underside: the same colours as the upper, without any marks. Margins of the wings entire. Wingspan nearly 2 1/2 inches (60 mm).
