= Pachnessa =

Scientific classification
- Kingdom: Animalia
- Phylum: Arthropoda
- Clade: Pancrustacea
- Class: Insecta
- Order: Coleoptera
- Suborder: Polyphaga
- Infraorder: Scarabaeiformia
- Family: Scarabaeidae
- Subfamily: Melolonthinae
- Genus: Pachnessa; Brenske, 1894

Genus of beetles

Pachnessa is a genus of beetles belonging to the family Scarabaeidae.

Species:

- Pachnessa drumonti Keith, 2009
- Pachnessa krali (Keith, 2002)
- Pachnessa merkli (Keith, 2002)
- Pachnessa nicobarica (Redtenbacher, 1868)
- Pachnessa smetsi Keith, 2009
- Pachnessa vietnamica Keith, 2009
