= Orientopsaltria =

- Orientopsaltria duarum

Scientific classification
- Domain: Eukaryota
- Kingdom: Animalia
- Phylum: Arthropoda
- Class: Insecta
- Order: Hemiptera
- Suborder: Auchenorrhyncha
- Family: Cicadidae
- Subfamily: Cicadinae
- Tribe: Dundubiini
- Subtribe: Orientopsaltriina
- Genus: Orientopsaltria; Kato, 1944

Species
- See text

Genus of true bugs

Orientopsaltria is a genus of cicadas from Southeast Asia. Its distribution encompasses Indochina (especially the Malayan Peninsula), Sumatra, Borneo, Palawan and the Philippines.

== List of species ==
- Orientopsaltria agatha (Moulton, 1911)
- Orientopsaltria alticola (Distant, 1905)
- Orientopsaltria angustata Duffels and Zaidi, 2000
- Orientopsaltria brooksi (Moulton, 1923)
- Orientopsaltria confluens Duffels and Zaidi, 2000
- Orientopsaltria duarum (Walker, 1857)
- Orientopsaltria fuliginosa (Walker, 1850)
- Orientopsaltria guttigera (Walker, 1856)
- Orientopsaltria hollowayi Duffels and Zaidi, 2000
- Orientopsaltria ida (Moulton, 1911)
- Orientopsaltria inermis (Stål, 1870)
- Orientopsaltria kinabaluana Duffels and Zaidi, 2000
- Orientopsaltria latispina Duffels and Zaidi, 2000
- Orientopsaltria maculosa Duffels and Zaidi, 2000
- Orientopsaltria montivaga (Distant, 1889)
- Orientopsaltria moultoni (China, 1926)
- Orientopsaltria noonadani Duffels and Zaidi, 2000
- Orientopsaltria padda (Distant, 1887)
- Orientopsaltria palawana Duffels and Zaidi, 2000
- Orientopsaltria phaeophila (Walker, 1850)
- Orientopsaltria ruslani Duffels and Zaidi, 1998
- Orientopsaltria saudarapadda Duffels and Zaidi, 1998
- Orientopsaltria sumatrana (Moulton, 1917)
- Orientopsaltria vanbreei Duffels and Zaidi, 2000
