= Pharaphodius marginellus =

Scientific classification
- Kingdom: Animalia
- Phylum: Arthropoda
- Clade: Pancrustacea
- Class: Insecta
- Order: Coleoptera
- Suborder: Polyphaga
- Infraorder: Scarabaeiformia
- Family: Scarabaeidae
- Genus: Pharaphodius
- Species: P. marginellus

Binomial name
- Pharaphodius marginellus (Fabricius, 1781)

Synonyms
- Scarabaeus marginellus Fabricius, 1781

Species of beetle

Pharaphodius marginellus is a species of beetle of the family Scarabaeidae. It is found in Bhutan, China (Guizhou, Hainan, Hong Kong, Zhejiang), India (Himachal Pradesh, Uttarakhand), Japan, Nepal, Pakistan, Taiwan, Indonesia (Sunda Islands, Kalimantan), Malaysia (Sabah), Myanmar, the Philippines, Thailand, Vietnam and Papua New Guinea.

== Description ==
Adults reach a length of about 6–6.5 mm (0.24–0.26 in). They have an oval-elongate, moderately convex, sub-shiny, glabrous, testaceous body, with the disc of the pronotum and elytral striae brownish.
