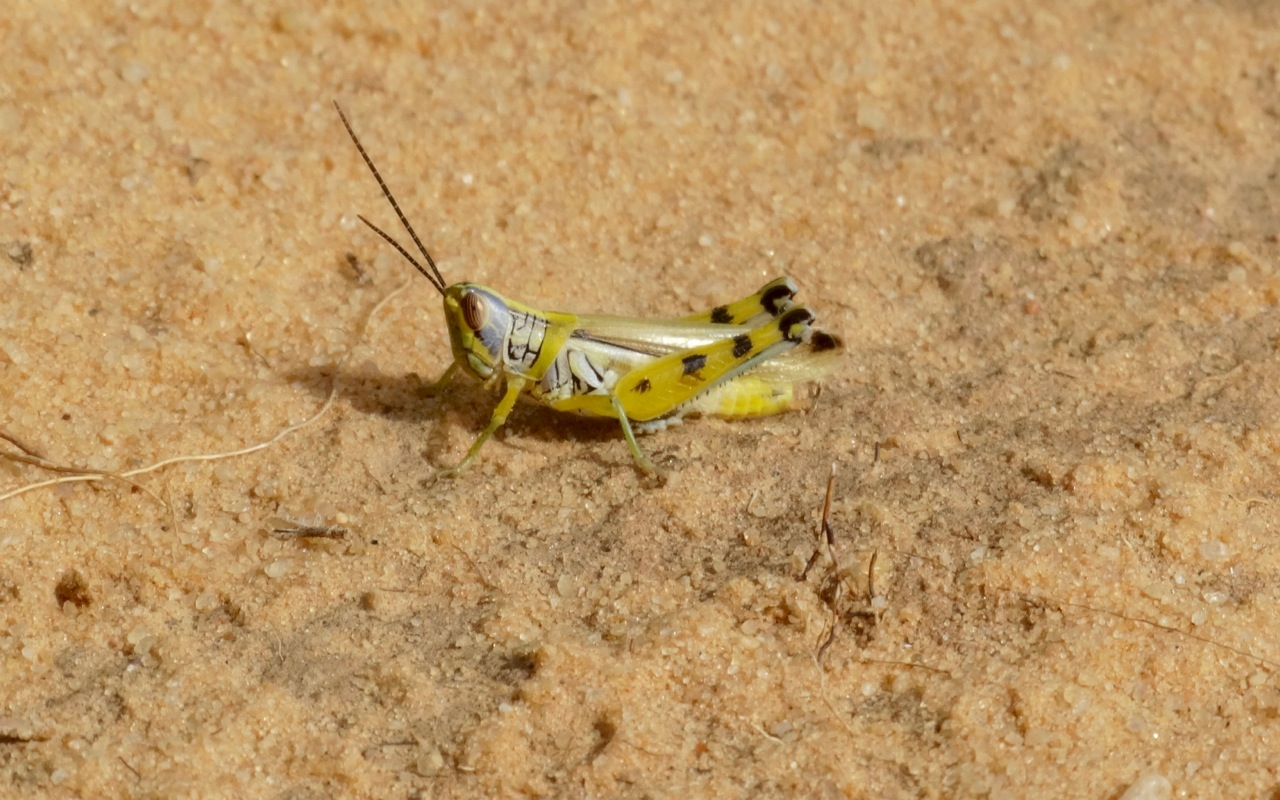

Scientific classification
- Kingdom: Animalia
- Phylum: Arthropoda
- Class: Insecta
- Order: Orthoptera
- Suborder: Caelifera
- Family: Acrididae
- Genus: Kraussella
- Species: K. amabile

Binomial name
- Kraussella amabile (Krauss, 1877)

= Kraussella amabile =

Species of grasshopper

Kraussella amabile is a species of grasshopper in the family Acrididae found in Africa.

In Mali, it is eaten by the Dogon people.

== Gallery ==
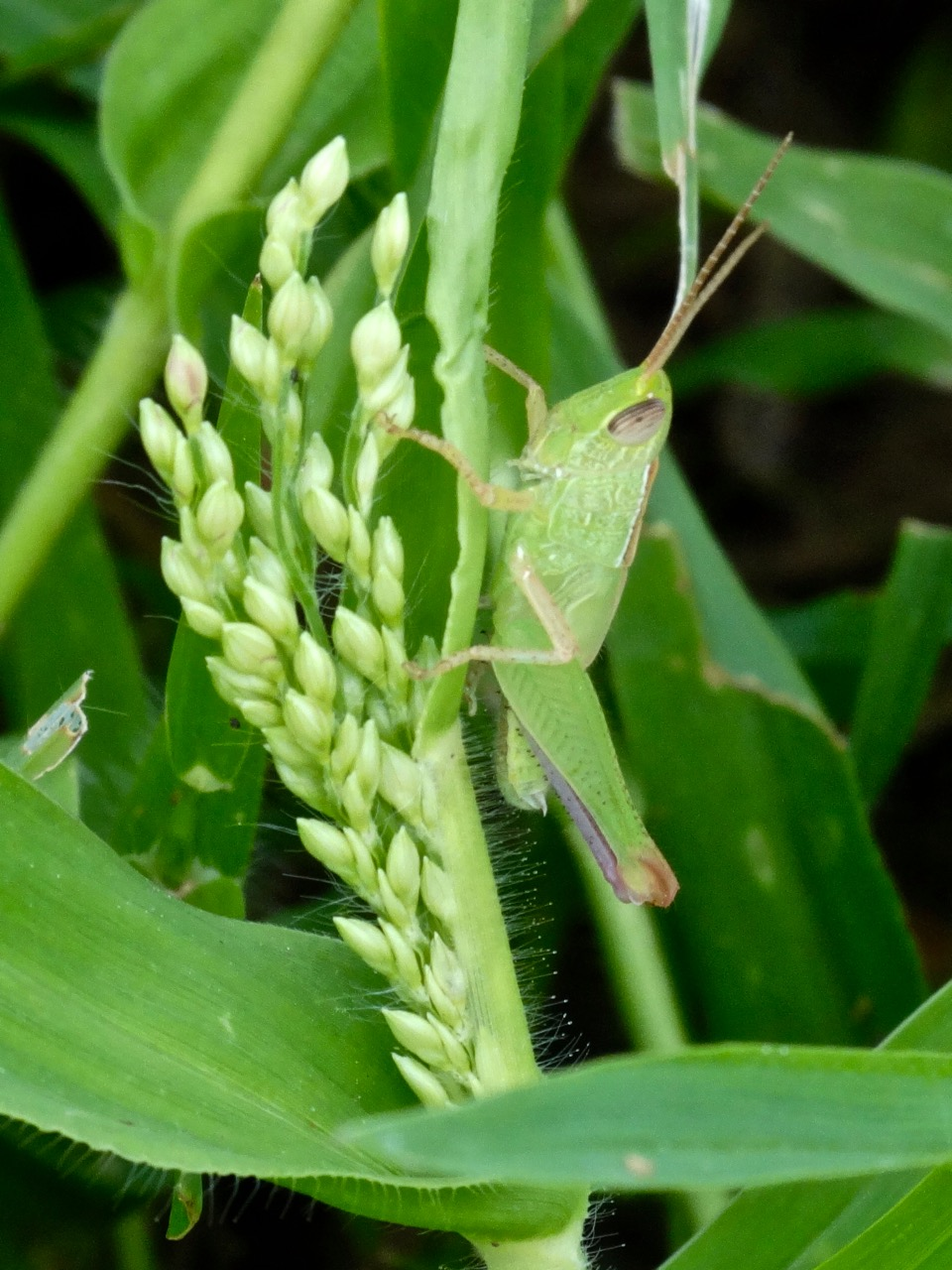
Fourth instar nymph photographed near Gnibi, Senegal

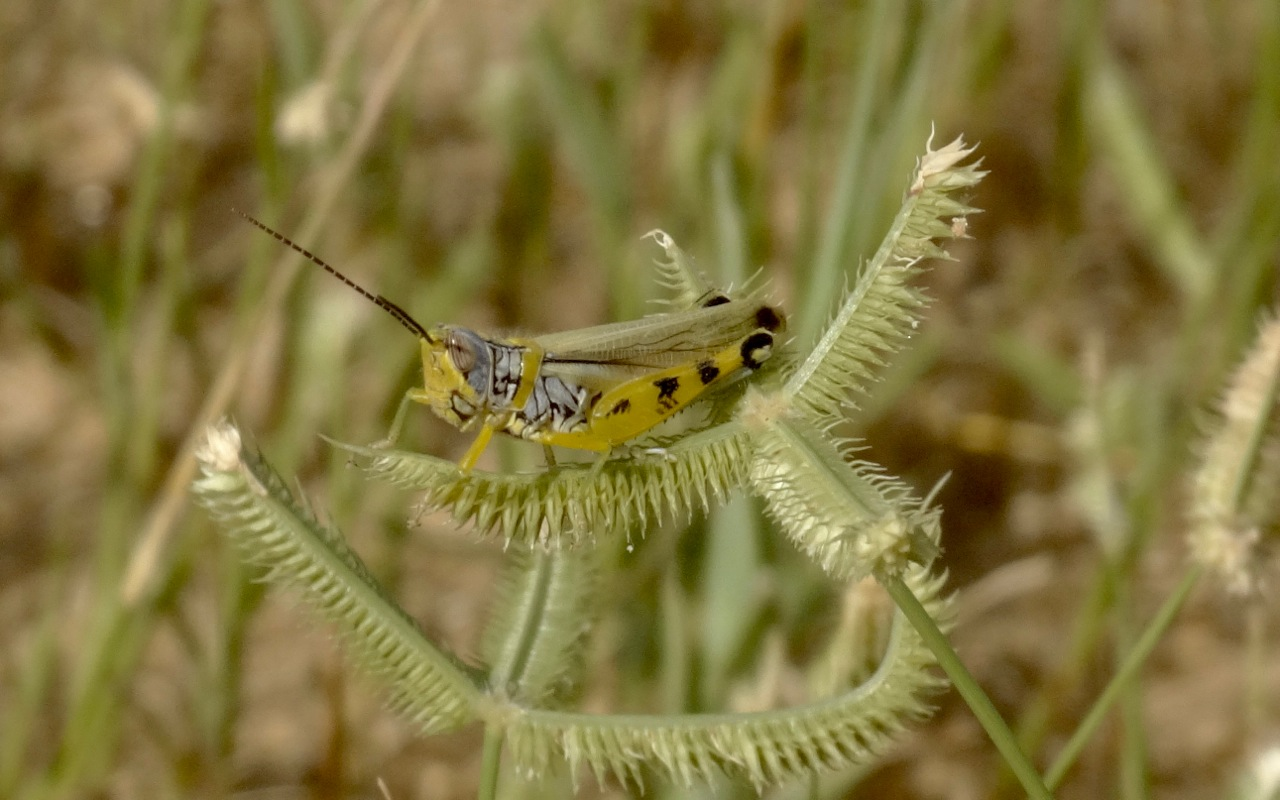
Male photographed near Belbedji, Zinder Region, Niger

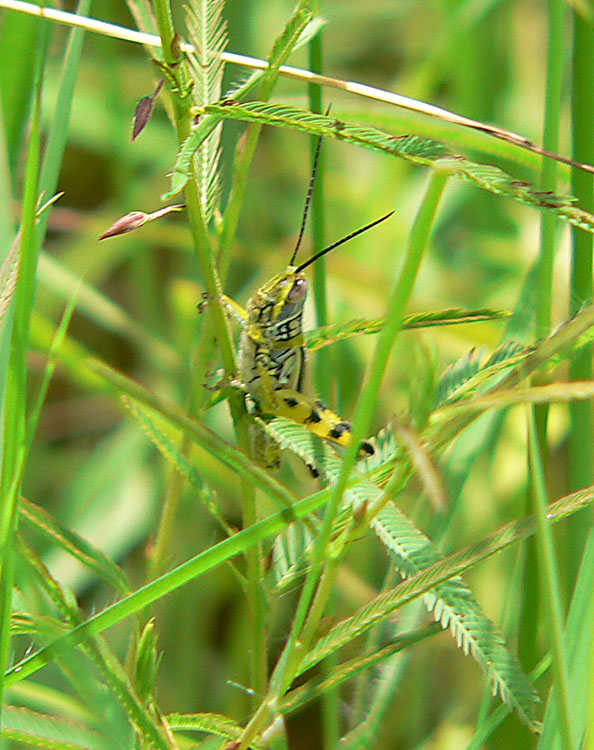
Male photographed in 2005 near Alfakouara, Benin

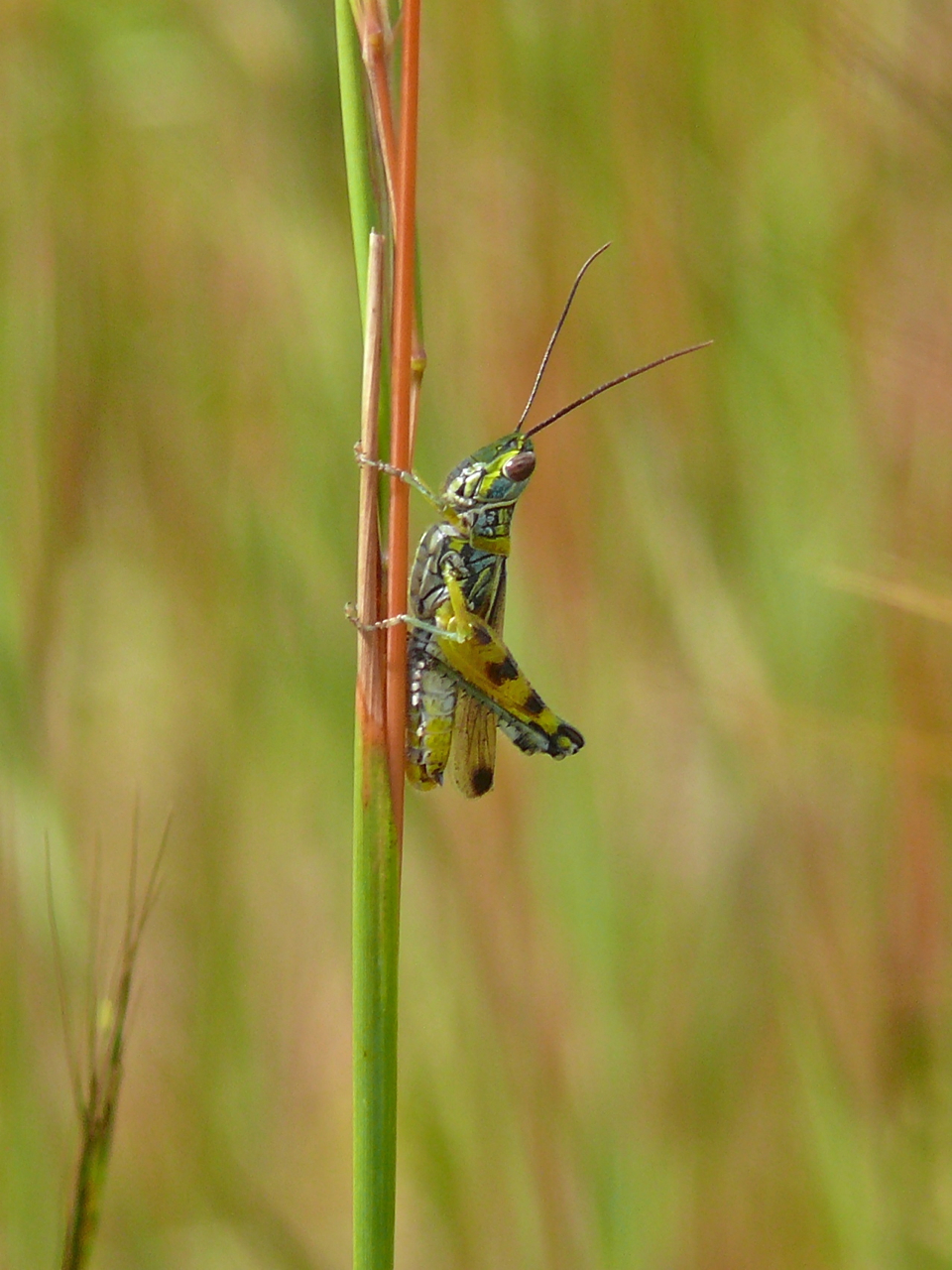
Male photographed near Nioro du Rip, Senegal
