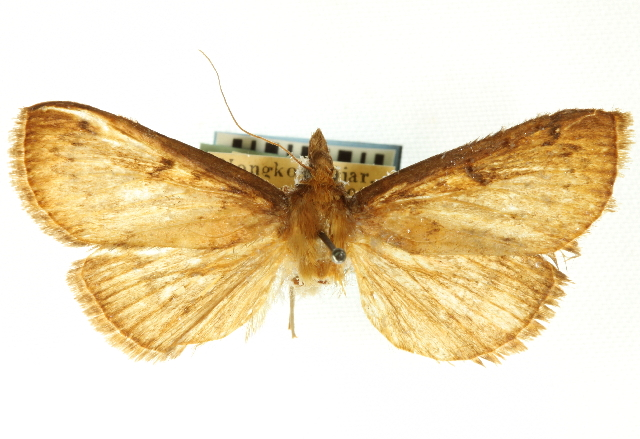

Scientific classification
- Kingdom: Animalia
- Phylum: Arthropoda
- Clade: Pancrustacea
- Class: Insecta
- Order: Lepidoptera
- Family: Crambidae
- Subfamily: Spilomelinae
- Tribe: Margaroniini
- Genus: Omphisa
- Species: O. fuscidentalis

Binomial name
- Omphisa fuscidentalis (Hampson, 1896)

Synonyms
- Chilo fuscidentalis Hampson, 1896

= Omphisa fuscidentalis =

Species of moth

Omphisa fuscidentalis, the bamboo worm (and one of the insects called bamboo borer), is a moth of the family Crambidae. Its habitat is the bamboo groves and forests in the cooler regions of northern Thailand, northern Laos, northern Myanmar, and adjacent parts of Yunnan Province, China, it is also found in some parts of North east India. The mature caterpillars are viewed as a delicacy by the inhabitants of these regions.

The wingspan of the male is 4 cm with a 2-cm-long body. The female is slightly larger with a 4.5 cm wingspan and a 2.2-cm-long body. The wings of this moth are orange-brown in colour, with black, curved stripes. The caterpillar is white in colour with a body length of 3.5 to 4 cm.

== Lifecycle ==
The adult moth only lives for two months: July and August. Mating takes place at night in early August after which the female lays a cluster of about 80-130 eggs near the base of a bamboo shoot. The larvae hatch after 12 days, and are pale brown in colour and covered with long hair. Working together, the larvae bore an entrance hole at an internode of the bamboo in one day. After entering the shoot, they then, also in one day, bore an exit hole for the mature moths from which to eventually emerge. The larvae turn white within three days.

Boring their way upwards from one bamboo internode to another, the larvae feed on the fresh inner pulp of the bamboo while avoiding common predators such as birds. After 45 to 60 days, the larvae mature and migrate down to the internode containing the exit hole where they enter a period of diapause for eight months, hanging upside down from the roof of the internode. This long period of diapause is exceptional for a tropical insect, and probably caused by the monsoonal character of the region which has a cool, dry period from November to February, a hot season from March to June, followed by a wet period from June through October, affecting the availability of food for the larvae. The pupal phase takes 46 to 60 days and falls in June and July.

Eleven different species of bamboo are infested. The infestation does not harm the plants, but instead makes the bamboo stronger than uninfested bamboo. However, the bamboo worm's activity may cause irregular growth patterns in the bamboo shoots which they occupy. In northern Thailand, O. fuscidentalis infestations have been found in Dendrocalamus membranaceus, D. hamiltonii, D. strictus, Bambusa nutans, B. blumeana, Gigantochloa albociliata, and G. nigrociliata.

== As food ==
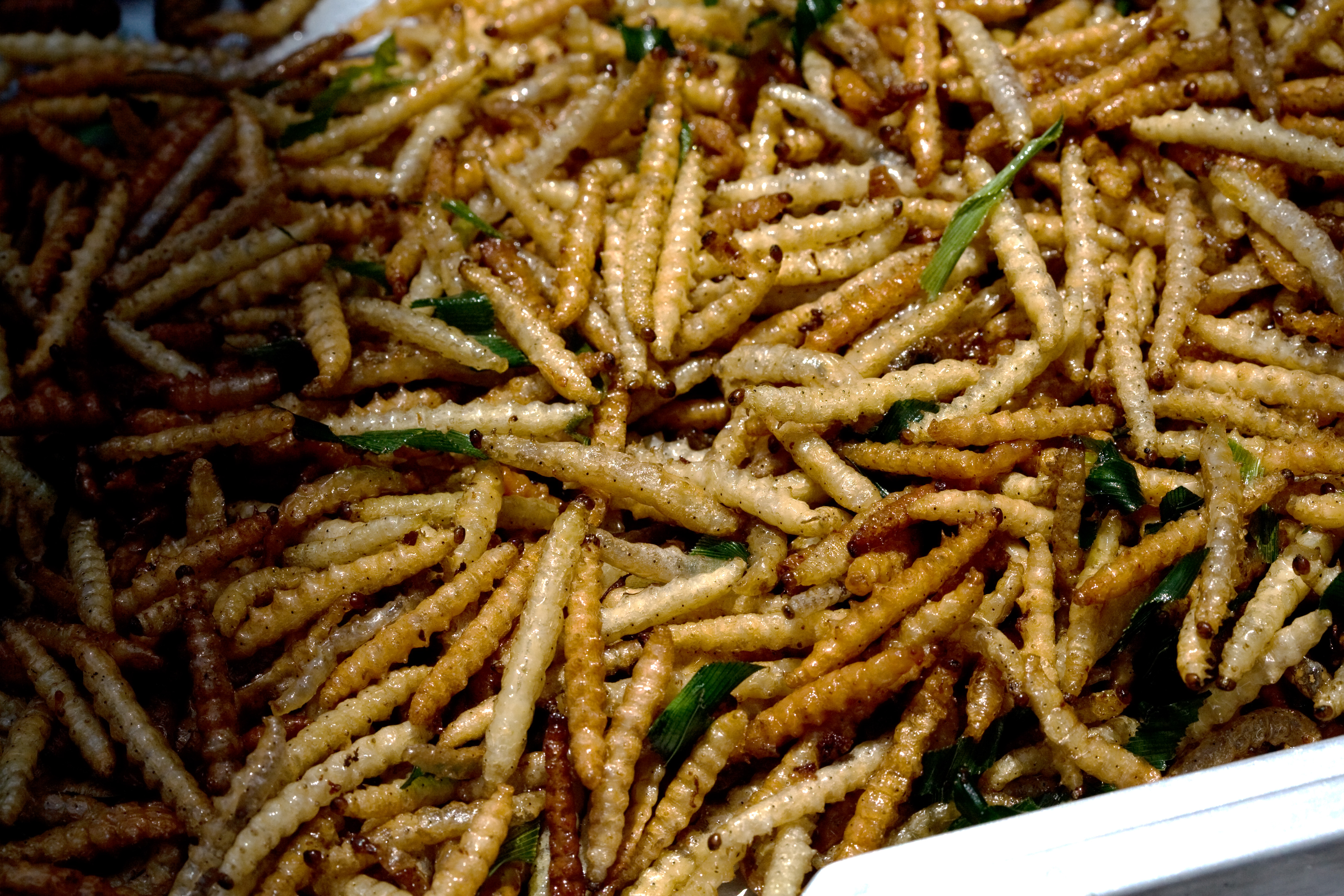
Deep-fried "bamboo worms" at a market in Bangkok

The larvae are edible and used as food in Asia. Collection of the larvae for consumption by people falls mainly in the period of diapause when the larvae congregate in one single internodal cavity. This involves carefully piercing through sections of the bamboo shoots with a cleaver where water is trapped. Cutting down the entire shoot will endanger the worms natural habitat. Together with other types of insects, the consumption of bamboo worms is gaining popularity in Asian regions. About 26% of their body weight is protein, and 51% fat. The name in Thai cuisine for this delicacy is "bamboo worm" (non mai phai, Thai: หนอนไม้ไผ่), but due to its appearance, it is commonly called rot duan (รถด่วน), meaning "express train". They are also considered to be an environmentally friendly diet as they do not require a large amount of resources when they are raised. Now, because of the greater demand for bamboo worms as food, they are being commercially bred and cultivated by insect farmers to ensure that their population in the wild is not affected. They are usually eaten deep-fried, sometimes flavoured with herbs, spices or condiments.

== See also ==
- Entomophagy, the consumption of insects as food
- Dinoderus minutus, a woodboring beetle that also goes by the name "bamboo borer"
