= Pharaphodius desertus =

Scientific classification
- Kingdom: Animalia
- Phylum: Arthropoda
- Clade: Pancrustacea
- Class: Insecta
- Order: Coleoptera
- Suborder: Polyphaga
- Infraorder: Scarabaeiformia
- Family: Scarabaeidae
- Genus: Pharaphodius
- Species: P. desertus

Binomial name
- Pharaphodius desertus (Klug, 1830)

Synonyms
- Aphodius desertus Klug, 1830; Aphodius perplexus Dejean, 1833

Species of beetle

Pharaphodius desertus is a species of beetle of the family Scarabaeidae. It is found in Chad, Kenya, Mauretania, Niger, Senegal, Somalia, Sudan, Egypt and Saudi Arabia.

== Description ==
Adults reach a length of about 4–5.5 mm (0.16–0.22 in). They have a rather short, glossy, yellowish-brown body. The pronotum has a discal spot, which is divided in two in some specimens.
