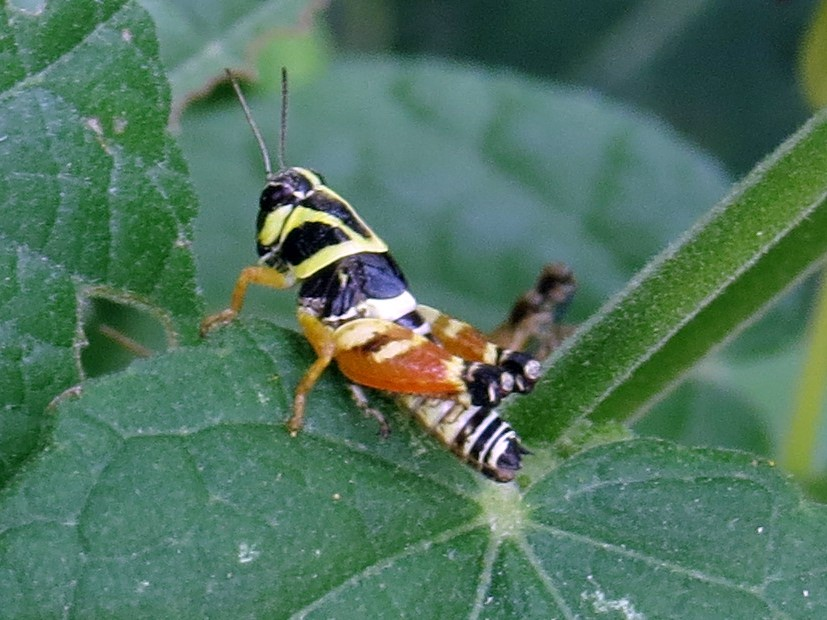

Scientific classification
- Domain: Eukaryota
- Kingdom: Animalia
- Phylum: Arthropoda
- Class: Insecta
- Order: Orthoptera
- Suborder: Caelifera
- Family: Acrididae
- Genus: Aidemona
- Species: A. azteca

Binomial name
- Aidemona azteca (Saussure, 1861)

= Aidemona azteca =

Species of grasshopper

Aidemona azteca, the Aztec spur-throat, is a species of spur-throated grasshopper in the family Acrididae. It is found in Central America.
