= Marmaroglypha nicobarica =

Scientific classification
- Domain: Eukaryota
- Kingdom: Animalia
- Phylum: Arthropoda
- Class: Insecta
- Order: Coleoptera
- Suborder: Polyphaga
- Infraorder: Cucujiformia
- Family: Cerambycidae
- Tribe: Lamiini
- Genus: Marmaroglypha
- Species: M. nicobarica

Binomial name
- Marmaroglypha nicobarica Redtenbacher, 1868

Species of beetle

Marmaroglypha nicobarica is a species of beetle in the family Cerambycidae. It was described by Redtenbacher in 1868. It is known from the Nicobar Islands.
