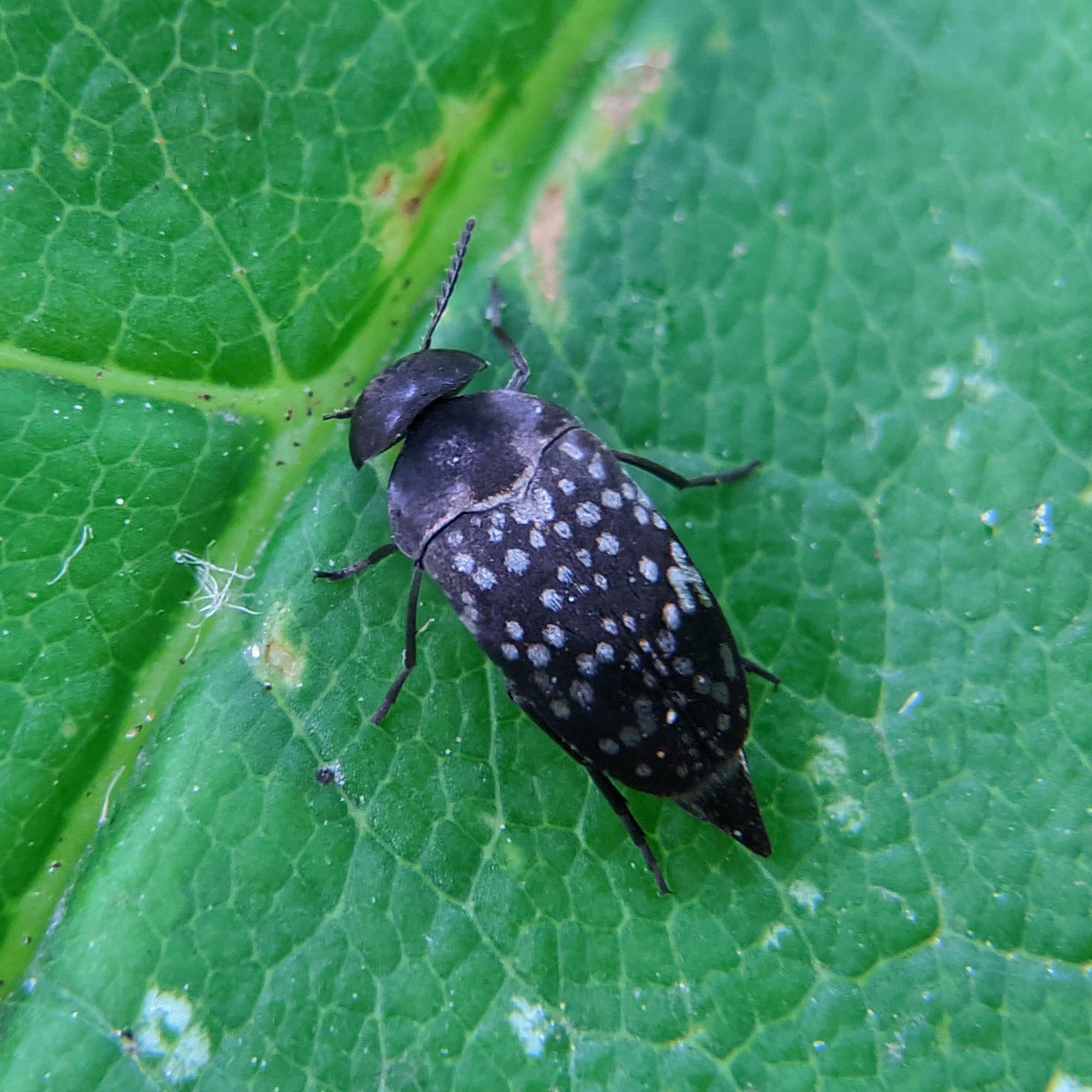
- Curtimorda maculosa, Germany

Scientific classification
- Domain: Eukaryota
- Kingdom: Animalia
- Phylum: Arthropoda
- Class: Insecta
- Order: Coleoptera
- Suborder: Polyphaga
- Infraorder: Cucujiformia
- Family: Mordellidae
- Subfamily: Mordellinae
- Tribe: Mordellini
- Genus: Curtimorda; Méquignon, 1946

= Curtimorda =

Genus of beetles

Curtimorda is a genus of tumbling flower beetles in the family Mordellidae. There are at least two described species in Curtimorda.

== Species ==
These two species belong to the genus Curtimorda:

- Curtimorda bisignata (Redtenbacher, 1849)
- Curtimorda maculosa (Naezen, 1794) (Europe)
