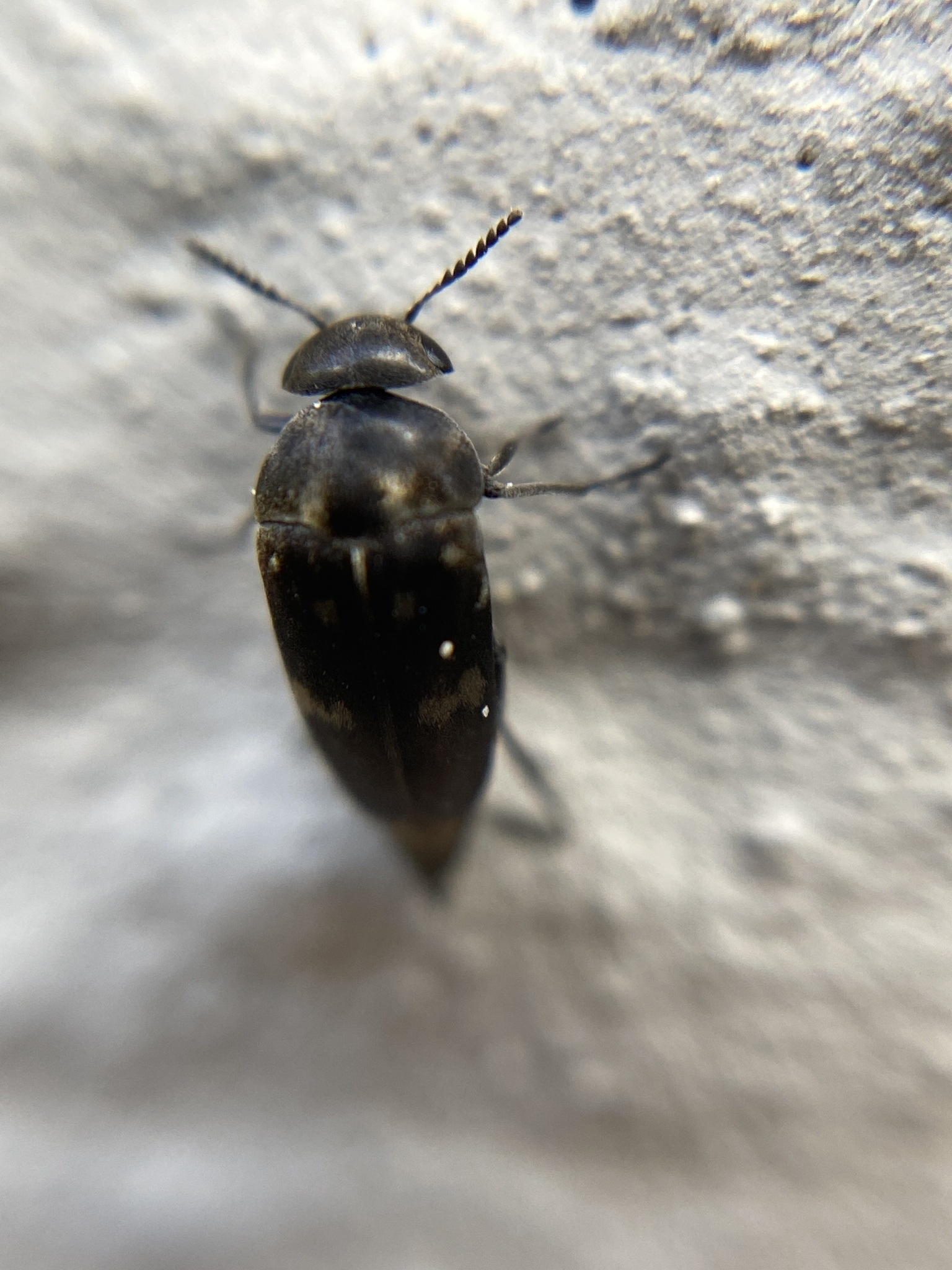

Scientific classification
- Domain: Eukaryota
- Kingdom: Animalia
- Phylum: Arthropoda
- Class: Insecta
- Order: Coleoptera
- Suborder: Polyphaga
- Infraorder: Cucujiformia
- Family: Mordellidae
- Genus: Curtimorda
- Species: C. bisignata

Binomial name
- Curtimorda bisignata (Redtenbacher, 1849)

= Curtimorda bisignata =

Species of beetle

Curtimorda bisignata is a species of beetle in the family Mordellidae. It was described by Ludwig Redtenbacher in 1849.
