= Agnia molitor =

Scientific classification
- Kingdom: Animalia
- Phylum: Arthropoda
- Clade: Pancrustacea
- Class: Insecta
- Order: Coleoptera
- Suborder: Polyphaga
- Infraorder: Cucujiformia
- Family: Cerambycidae
- Genus: Agnia
- Species: A. molitor

Binomial name
- Agnia molitor (Aurivillius, 1927)

Synonyms
- Euthyastus molitor Aurivillius, 1927

Species of beetle

Agnia molitor is a species of beetle in the family Cerambycidae. It was described by Per Olof Christopher Aurivillius in 1927, originally under the genus Euthyastus. It is known from the Philippines and Sulawesi.
