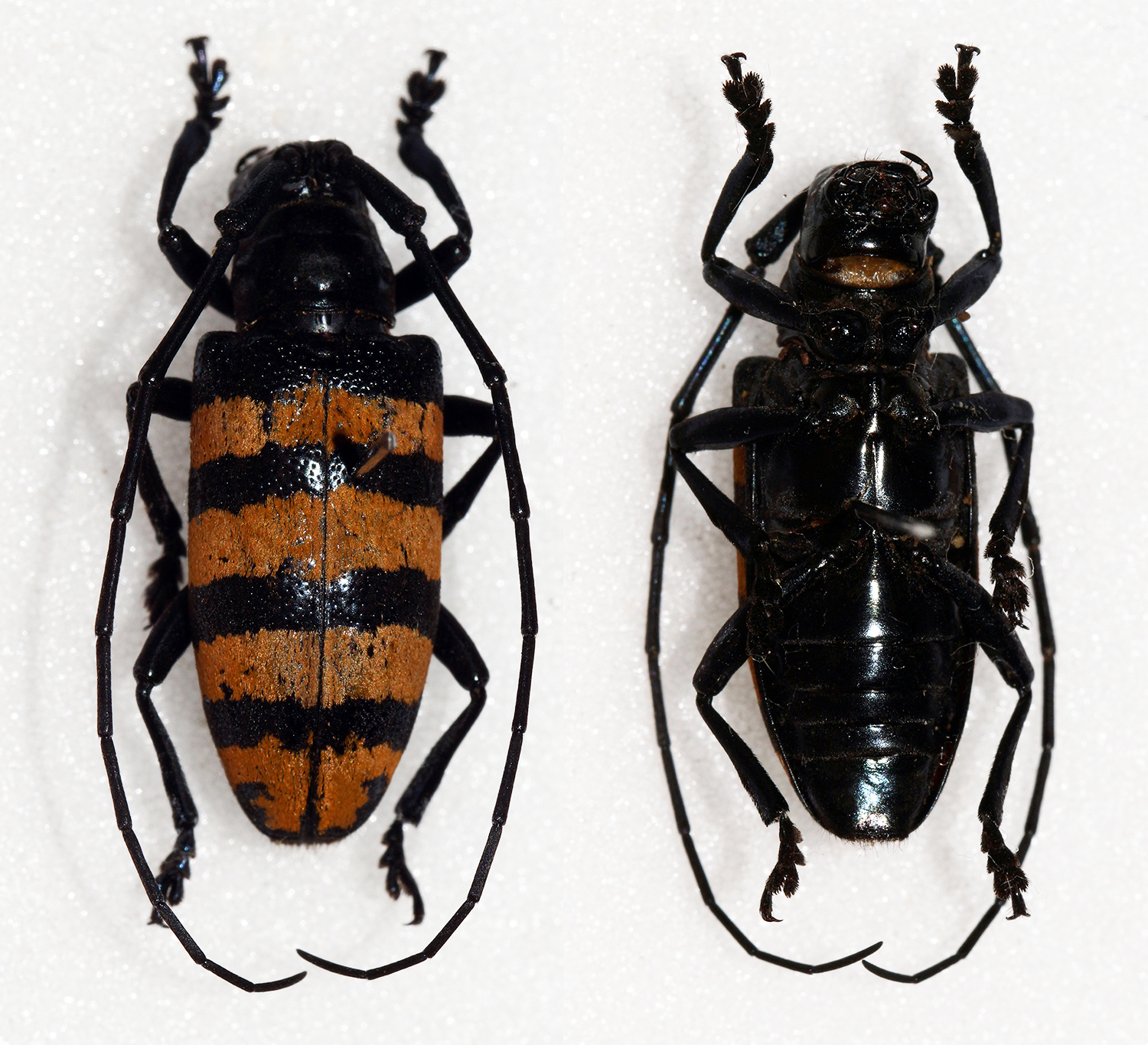
- Agnia fasciata

Scientific classification
- Domain: Eukaryota
- Kingdom: Animalia
- Phylum: Arthropoda
- Class: Insecta
- Order: Coleoptera
- Suborder: Polyphaga
- Infraorder: Cucujiformia
- Family: Cerambycidae
- Tribe: Lamiini
- Genus: Agnia

= Agnia (beetle) =

Genus of beetles

Agnia is a genus of longhorn beetles of the subfamily Lamiinae, containing the following species:

- Agnia bakeri Aurivillius, 1927
- Agnia casta Newman, 1842
- Agnia clara Newman, 1842
- Agnia eximia Pascoe, 1860
- Agnia fasciata Pascoe, 1859
- Agnia lucipor Breuning, 1982
- Agnia molitor (Aurivillius, 1927)
- Agnia pubescens Aurivillius, 1898
- Agnia pulchra Aurivillius, 1891
