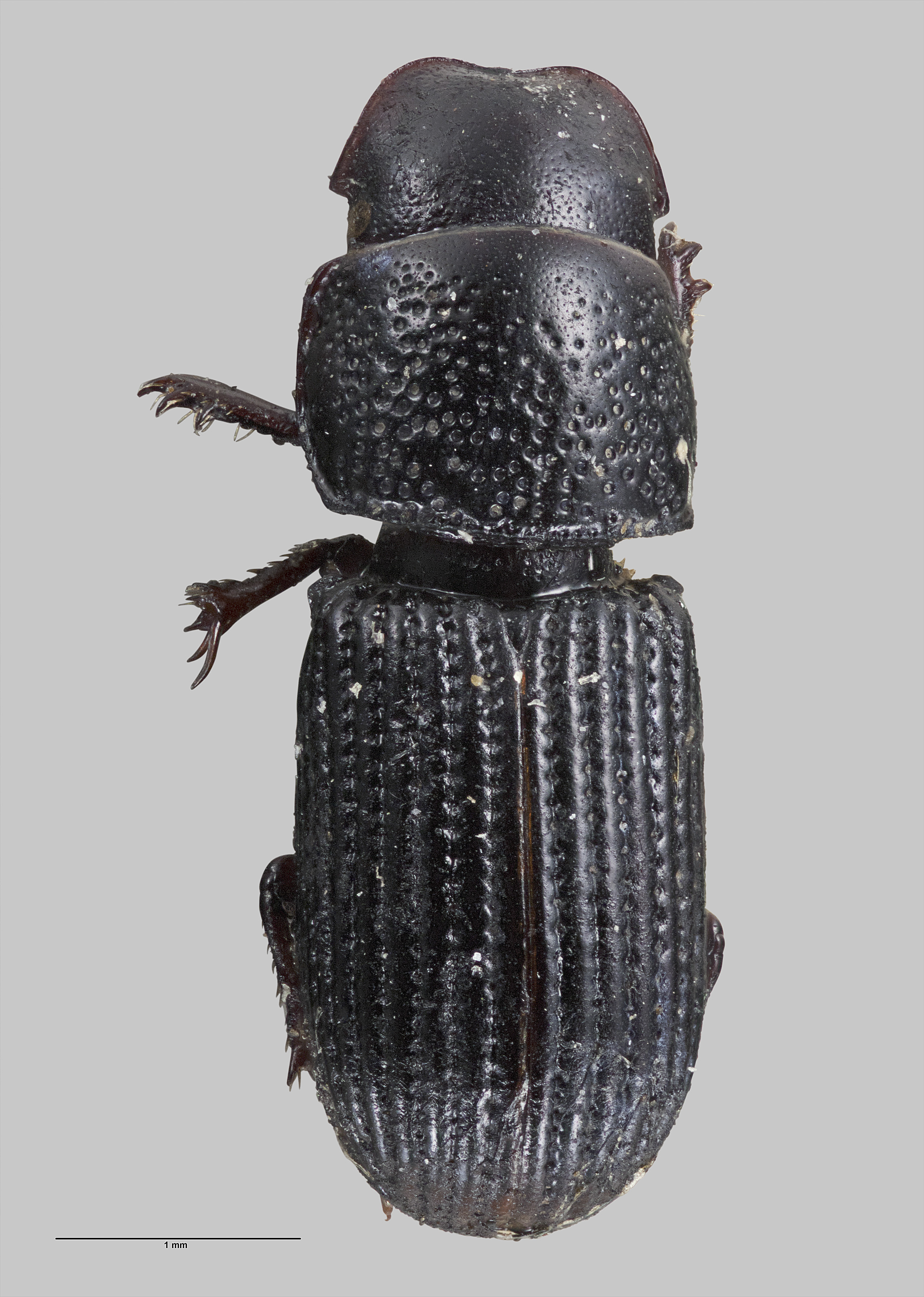
- Saprosites raoulensis, New Zealand

Scientific classification
- Kingdom: Animalia
- Phylum: Arthropoda
- Clade: Pancrustacea
- Class: Insecta
- Order: Coleoptera
- Suborder: Polyphaga
- Infraorder: Scarabaeiformia
- Family: Scarabaeidae
- Subfamily: Aphodiinae
- Tribe: Eupariini
- Genus: Saprosites; Redtenbacher, 1858

= Saprosites =

Genus of scarab beetles

Saprosites is a genus of scarab beetles in the family Scarabaeidae. There are more than 130 accepted species in Saprosites.

== Species ==
These 137 species belong to Saprosites:

- Saprosites abyssinicus Bordat, 1990
- Saprosites africanus Endrödi, 1967
- Saprosites arabicus Pittino, 1984
- Saprosites armatus Pittino, 2008
- Saprosites balthasari Endrödi, 1951
- Saprosites bangueyensis Paulian, 1944
- Saprosites barombii Petrovitz, 1961
- Saprosites bolivianus Petrovitz, 1961
- Saprosites brevitarsis Endrödi, 1964
- Saprosites breviusculus Harold, 1867
- Saprosites bunyaensis Stebnicka & Howden, 1996
- Saprosites burgeoni Paulian, 1939
- Saprosites calvus Schmidt, 1911
- Saprosites camerounensis Paulian, 1940
- Saprosites capitalis Fairmaire, 1883
- Saprosites carinatus Bordat, 1992
- Saprosites cariniceps Pittino, 2008
- Saprosites castaneus Lea, 1923
- Saprosites catenatus (Fauvel, 1903)
- Saprosites cavus Schmidt, 1908
- Saprosites celebicus Paulian, 1944
- Saprosites cheesmani Paulian, 1939
- Saprosites chyuluensis Paulian, 1939
- Saprosites clydensis Stebnicka & Howden, 1996
- Saprosites communis (Broun, 1880)
- Saprosites comorianus Bordat, 1990
- Saprosites consonus Schmidt, 1911
- Saprosites crockerensis Stebnicka, 1991
- Saprosites cycloporum Paulian, 1944
- Saprosites declivis Schmidt, 1911
- Saprosites degallieri Bordat & Théry, 2012
- Saprosites deharvengi Bordat & Théry, 2012
- Saprosites dentipes Harold, 1867
- Saprosites difficilis Harold, 1877
- Saprosites dilutus (Fairmaire, 1849)
- Saprosites distans (Sharp, 1876)
- Saprosites dubius Bordat, 1990
- Saprosites dudichi Endrödi, 1951
- Saprosites dufaui Paulian, 1947
- Saprosites dynastoides (Walker, 1858)
- Saprosites enarotadii Stebnicka, 1998
- Saprosites exaratus (Fleutiaux & Sallé, 1889)
- Saprosites excisus Petrovitz, 1976
- Saprosites explanatus Bordat, 1990
- Saprosites exsculptus (White, 1846)
- Saprosites falcatus Schmidt, 1908
- Saprosites fastus Petrovitz, 1965
- Saprosites fodori Endrödi, 1951
- Saprosites formosensis Nomura, 1939
- Saprosites fortipes (Broun, 1886)
- Saprosites freyi Petrovitz, 1956
- Saprosites gestroi Schmidt, 1911
- Saprosites girardi Bordat, 2003
- Saprosites gnomus Balthasar, 1941
- Saprosites grenadensis Arrow, 1903
- Saprosites guineensis Petrovitz, 1956
- Saprosites haafi Petrovitz, 1956
- Saprosites holzschuhi Pittino, 2008
- Saprosites implicatus Schmidt, 1922
- Saprosites japonicus Waterhouse, 1875
- Saprosites javanus Balthasar, 1941
- Saprosites kaimai Stebnicka, 2005
- Saprosites kapitensis Petrovitz, 1973
- Saprosites kinabalu Pittino, 2008
- Saprosites kingsensis Stebnicka, 2001
- Saprosites komumi Stebnicka, 1998
- Saprosites laeviceps Harold, 1877
- Saprosites laticeps (Fairmaire, 1871)
- Saprosites laticollis Pittino, 2008
- Saprosites lepersonnei Paulian, 1942
- Saprosites lodoicea (Scott, 1912)
- Saprosites lodoiceae (Scott, 1912)
- Saprosites loebli Balthasar, 1972
- Saprosites longethorax Paulian, 1944
- Saprosites madagascariensis Schmidt, 1911
- Saprosites mahavus Stebnicka, 2012
- Saprosites malkini Paulian, 1958
- Saprosites mansuetus Blackburn, 1904
- Saprosites marchionalis Harold, 1877
- Saprosites matangi Stebnicka, 2012
- Saprosites meditans Harold, 1867
- Saprosites mendax (Blackburn, 1891)
- Saprosites merkli Pittino, 2008
- Saprosites mesosternalis Lea, 1923
- Saprosites mistakensis Stebnicka & Howden, 1996
- Saprosites mjoebergi Gillet, 1924
- Saprosites monteverdeae Stebnicka, 2001
- Saprosites narae Lewis, 1895
- Saprosites natalensis (Péringuey, 1901)
- Saprosites nepalensis Pittino, 2008
- Saprosites nitidicollis (MacLeay, 1871)
- Saprosites obscurus Endrödi, 1964
- Saprosites pahangensis Stebnicka, 2012
- Saprosites palmarum (Scott, 1912)
- Saprosites papuanus Stebnicka, 1984
- Saprosites parallelicollis Bordat, 1990
- Saprosites parallelus Harold, 1867
- Saprosites pauliani Bordat, 1990
- Saprosites penrisseni Stebnicka, 2012
- Saprosites perbrevitarsis (Schmidt, 1909)
- Saprosites peregrinus Redtenbacher, 1858
- Saprosites perforatus Bordat, 1990
- Saprosites perssoni Bordat, 1996
- Saprosites pleurophoroides Balthasar, 1971
- Saprosites porongurupae Stebnicka & Howden, 1996
- Saprosites puncticollis Harold, 1867
- Saprosites punctiventris Petrovitz, 1961
- Saprosites pygmaeus Harold, 1877
- Saprosites raffrayi Paulian, 1944
- Saprosites raoulensis (Broun, 1910)
- Saprosites rectus Bordat, 1990
- Saprosites rougemonti Pittino, 2008
- Saprosites rufopolitus Gillet, 1924
- Saprosites rufus Paulian, 1944
- Saprosites schoutedeni Paulian, 1939
- Saprosites sicardi Bordat, 1990
- Saprosites staudingeri Petrovitz, 1969
- Saprosites sternalis Blackburn, 1904
- Saprosites subterraneus Petrovitz, 1976
- Saprosites sulcatissimus (Broun, 1911)
- Saprosites sulcatus Harold, 1869
- Saprosites sulciceps Pittino, 2008
- Saprosites sulcicollis Petrovitz, 1969
- Saprosites tantulus Bordat, 1990
- Saprosites tenuistriatus Bordat, 1990
- Saprosites titschacki Balthasar, 1941
- Saprosites topali Pittino, 2008
- Saprosites verecundus Schmidt, 1909
- Saprosites vosseleri Petrovitz, 1965
- Saprosites watti Stebnicka, 2001
- Saprosites wauensis Stebnicka, 1984
- Saprosites weisei Petrovitz, 1969
- Saprosites wittei Paulian, 1954
- Saprosites yanoi Nomura, 1939
- Saprosites yasutakai Ochi & Kawahara, 2019
- † Saprosites cascus Britton, 1960
- † Saprosites succini (Zang, 1905)
