= Marmaroglypha vermiculata =

Scientific classification
- Kingdom: Animalia
- Phylum: Arthropoda
- Class: Insecta
- Order: Coleoptera
- Suborder: Polyphaga
- Infraorder: Cucujiformia
- Family: Cerambycidae
- Genus: Marmaroglypha
- Species: M. vermiculata

Binomial name
- Marmaroglypha vermiculata Breuning, 1948

Species of beetle

Marmaroglypha vermiculata is a species of beetle in the family Cerambycidae. It was described by Stephan von Breuning in 1948. It is known from Borneo and Indonesia.
