= Saprosites consonus =

Scientific classification
- Kingdom: Animalia
- Phylum: Arthropoda
- Clade: Pancrustacea
- Class: Insecta
- Order: Coleoptera
- Suborder: Polyphaga
- Infraorder: Scarabaeiformia
- Family: Scarabaeidae
- Genus: Saprosites
- Species: S. consonus

Binomial name
- Saprosites consonus Schmidt, 1910

Species of beetle

Saprosites consonus is a species of beetle of the family Scarabaeidae. It is found in Benin, Cameroon, Ghana, Ivory Coast, the Democratic Republic of the Congo, Guinea, the Republic of the Congo and Sao Thomé.

== Description ==
Adults reach a length of about 2 mm (0.079 in). They have a flat, parallel-sided, uniformly reddish-brown body, sometimes with the disc of the pronotum darker.
