= Saprosites watti =

Scientific classification
- Kingdom: Animalia
- Phylum: Arthropoda
- Clade: Pancrustacea
- Class: Insecta
- Order: Coleoptera
- Suborder: Polyphaga
- Infraorder: Scarabaeiformia
- Family: Scarabaeidae
- Genus: Saprosites
- Species: S. watti

Binomial name
- Saprosites watti Stebnicka, 2001

Species of beetle

Saprosites watti is a species of beetle of the family Scarabaeidae. It is found in New Zealand.

== Description ==
Adults reach a length of about 2.5–3.2 mm (0.098–0.126 in). They have a elongate-oval, shiny, reddish black or black body, with the elytra lighter than the head and pronotum in most specimens.

== Life history ==
Specimens have been collected in moss and leaf litter.
