= Saprosites penrisseni =

Scientific classification
- Kingdom: Animalia
- Phylum: Arthropoda
- Clade: Pancrustacea
- Class: Insecta
- Order: Coleoptera
- Suborder: Polyphaga
- Infraorder: Scarabaeiformia
- Family: Scarabaeidae
- Genus: Saprosites
- Species: S. penrisseni

Binomial name
- Saprosites penrisseni Stebnicka, 2012

Species of beetle

Saprosites penrisseni is a species of beetle of the family Scarabaeidae. It is found in Malaysia (Sarawak).

== Description ==
Adults reach a length of about 2.8–3 mm (0.11–0.12 in). They have a convex, dark castaneous, shining body.
