= Saprosites matangi =

Scientific classification
- Kingdom: Animalia
- Phylum: Arthropoda
- Clade: Pancrustacea
- Class: Insecta
- Order: Coleoptera
- Suborder: Polyphaga
- Infraorder: Scarabaeiformia
- Family: Scarabaeidae
- Genus: Saprosites
- Species: S. matangi

Binomial name
- Saprosites matangi Stebnicka, 2012

Species of beetle

Saprosites matangi is a species of beetle of the family Scarabaeidae. It is found in Malaysia (Sarawak).

== Description ==
Adults reach a length of about 2.1–2.3 mm (0.083–0.091 in). They have a light castaneous to piceous, shining body.
