= Saprosites kingsensis =

Scientific classification
- Kingdom: Animalia
- Phylum: Arthropoda
- Clade: Pancrustacea
- Class: Insecta
- Order: Coleoptera
- Suborder: Polyphaga
- Infraorder: Scarabaeiformia
- Family: Scarabaeidae
- Genus: Saprosites
- Species: S. kingsensis

Binomial name
- Saprosites kingsensis Stebnicka, 2001

Species of beetle

Saprosites kingsensis is a species of beetle of the family Scarabaeidae. It is found in New Zealand.

== Description ==
Adults reach a length of about 3–3.4 mm (0.12–0.13 in). They have a parallel-sided, shiny, reddish black to black body.

== Life history ==
Specimens have been collected in leaf mould, litter, and under moss.
