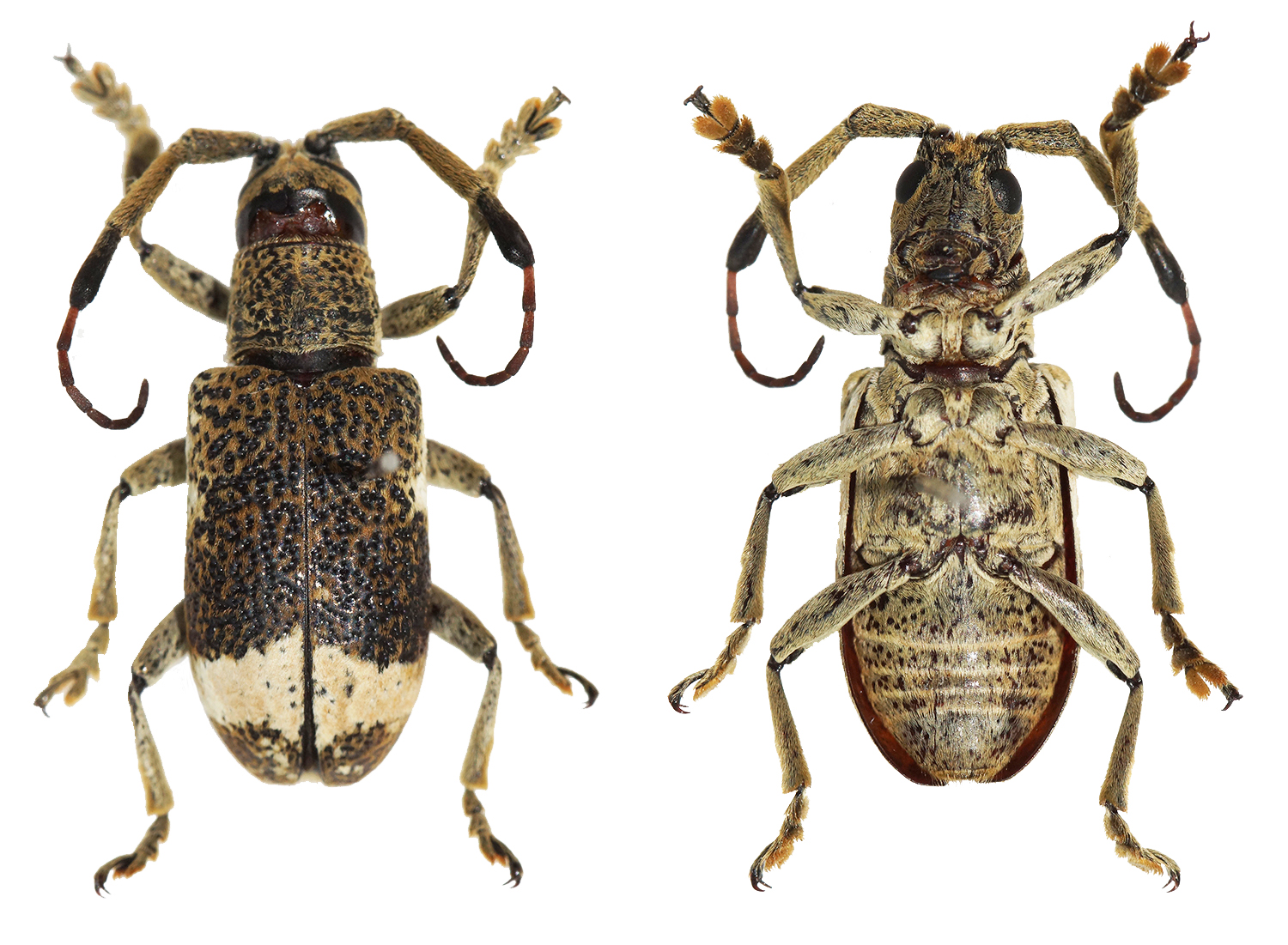
- Marmaroglypha Fasciata

Scientific classification
- Kingdom: Animalia
- Phylum: Arthropoda
- Class: Insecta
- Order: Coleoptera
- Suborder: Polyphaga
- Infraorder: Cucujiformia
- Family: Cerambycidae
- Genus: Marmaroglypha
- Species: M. fasciata

Binomial name
- Marmaroglypha fasciata (Pascoe, 1869)

Synonyms
- Achthophora fasciata Pascoe, 1869

= Marmaroglypha fasciata =

Species of beetle

Marmaroglypha fasciata is a species of beetle in the family Cerambycidae. It was described by Francis Polkinghorne Pascoe in 1869. It is known from Borneo and Malaysia.
