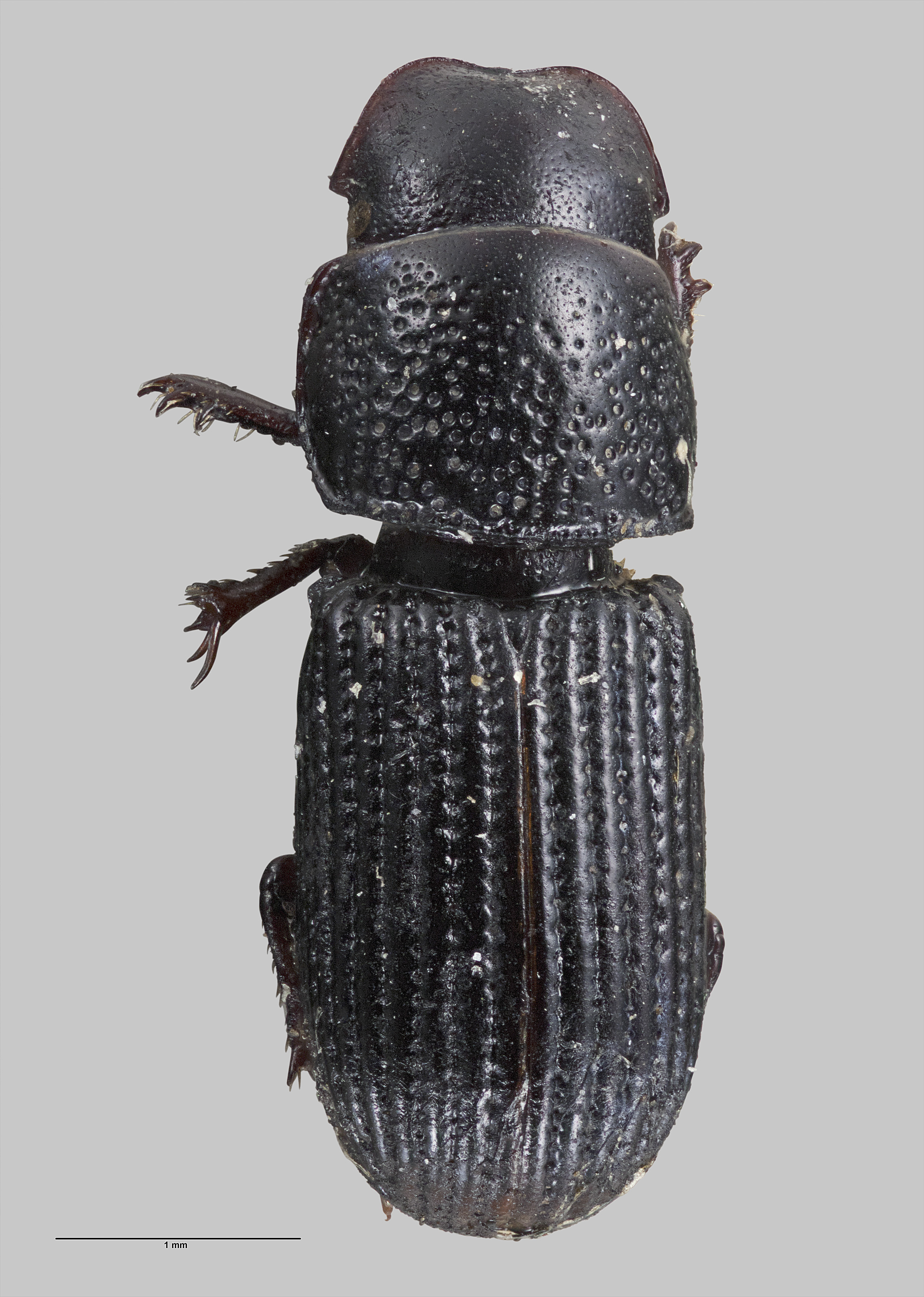
- Saprosites raoulensis (Broun, 1910) holotype specimen held at Auckland Museum licensed under CC BY 4.0.

Scientific classification
- Kingdom: Animalia
- Phylum: Arthropoda
- Clade: Pancrustacea
- Class: Insecta
- Order: Coleoptera
- Suborder: Polyphaga
- Infraorder: Scarabaeiformia
- Family: Scarabaeidae
- Genus: Saprosites
- Species: S. raoulensis

Binomial name
- Saprosites raoulensis (Broun, 1910)

Synonyms
- Aphodius raoulensis (Broun, 1910)

= Saprosites raoulensis =

Species of beetle

Saprosites raoulensis is a species of dung beetle endemic to the Kermadec Islands in New Zealand. The holotype specimen of this species was discovered during a scientific expedition to the Kermadecs by W. L. Wallace in 1908. It was found under rotten logs on Raoul Island.

== Taxonomy ==
New Zealand entomologist Thomas Broun first described this beetle as Aphodius raoulensis in 1910 after receiving the specimen for determination from its collector W. L. Wallace. This type specimen is currently held at the Auckland Museum. The species was placed in the genus Saprosites by Aola M. Richards in 1959 and the holotype specimen was redescribed by Richards as Broun's description differed from the type specimen in several ways.

The specific name is derived from the name of the island the species was collected from, Raoul Island, and -ensis a Latin derived adjective suffix meaning "originated in".

== Description ==
Saprosites raoulensis is 5.5 mm in length and 2.5 mm in width. The beetle is pitch black in colour with the front border of the prothorax being a dull brick red. Its legs are a reddish brown.

== Distribution and habitat ==
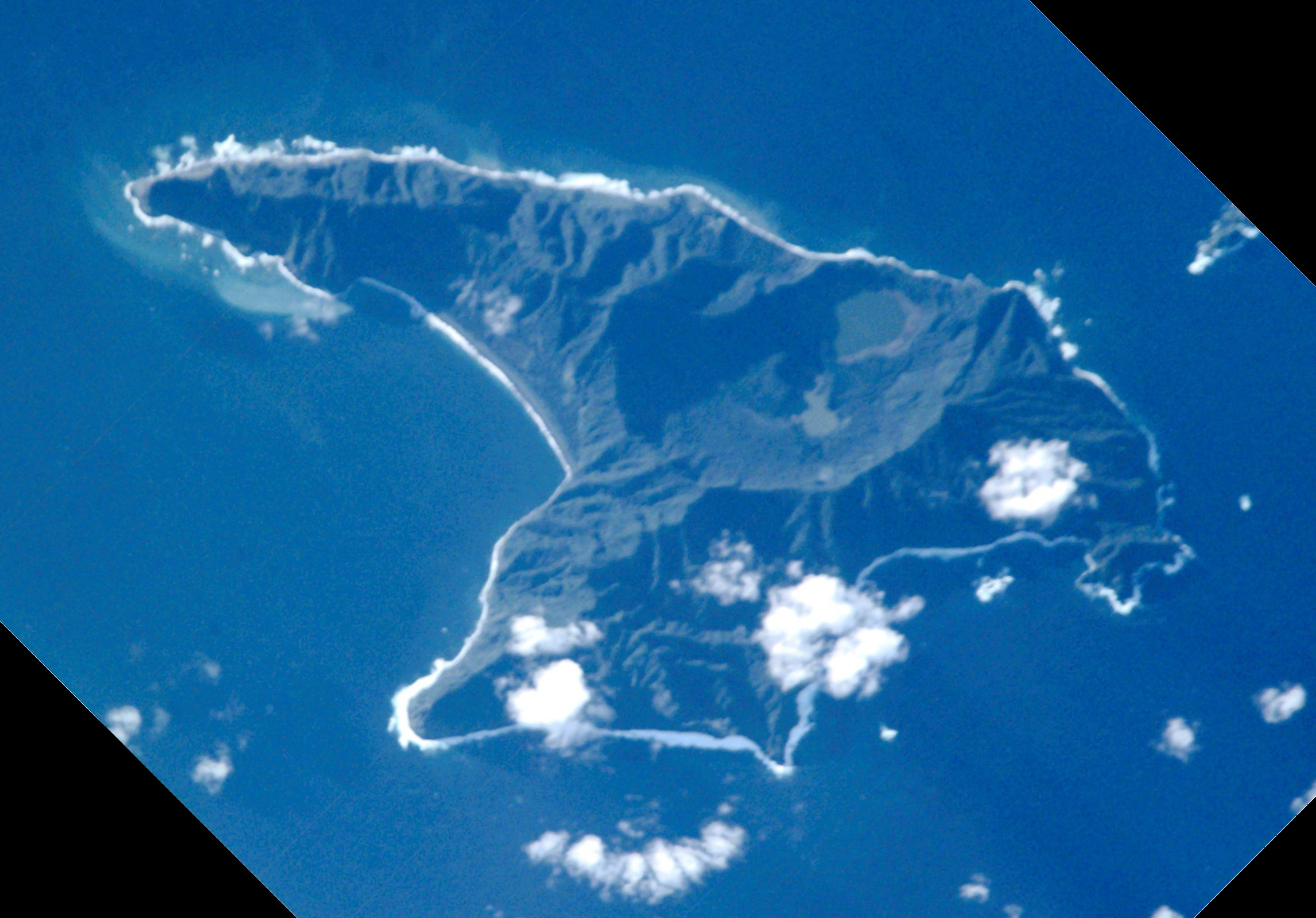
Raoul Island

This beetle is apparently rare and specimens have only been recorded as being from Raoul Island.

== Predation ==
Broun hypothesized that the significant number of rats on Raoul Island at the time of collection of the type specimen were likely to negatively impact various beetle populations.
