= Saprosites sternalis =

Scientific classification
- Kingdom: Animalia
- Phylum: Arthropoda
- Clade: Pancrustacea
- Class: Insecta
- Order: Coleoptera
- Suborder: Polyphaga
- Infraorder: Scarabaeiformia
- Family: Scarabaeidae
- Genus: Saprosites
- Species: S. sternalis

Binomial name
- Saprosites sternalis Blackburn, 1904

Species of beetle

Saprosites sternalis is a species of beetle of the family Scarabaeidae. It is found in Australia (Queensland).

== Description ==
Adults reach a length of about 3.5–4 mm (0.14–0.16 in). They have a dark castaneous body.

== Life history ==
Specimens have been collected in leaf litter.
