= Saprosites fodori =

Scientific classification
- Kingdom: Animalia
- Phylum: Arthropoda
- Clade: Pancrustacea
- Class: Insecta
- Order: Coleoptera
- Suborder: Polyphaga
- Infraorder: Scarabaeiformia
- Family: Scarabaeidae
- Genus: Saprosites
- Species: S. fodori

Binomial name
- Saprosites fodori Endrödi, 1951

Synonyms
- Saprosites ullrichi Stebnicka, 1984

Species of beetle

Saprosites fodori is a species of beetle of the family Scarabaeidae. It is found in Papua New Guinea and Indonesia (Irian Jaya).

== Description ==
Adults reach a length of about 3.2–3.8 mm (0.13–0.15 in). They have an elongate oval, shiny, black or reddish-black body.
