= Saprosites marchionalis =

Scientific classification
- Kingdom: Animalia
- Phylum: Arthropoda
- Clade: Pancrustacea
- Class: Insecta
- Order: Coleoptera
- Suborder: Polyphaga
- Infraorder: Scarabaeiformia
- Family: Scarabaeidae
- Genus: Saprosites
- Species: S. marchionalis

Binomial name
- Saprosites marchionalis Harold, 1877

Species of beetle

Saprosites marchionalis is a species of beetle of the family Scarabaeidae. It is found in Malaysia (Sabah, Sarawak).

== Description ==
Adults reach a length of about 6–6.5 mm (0.24–0.26 in). They have a not quite parallel-sided, piceous, shining body.
