= Agnia eximia =

Scientific classification
- Kingdom: Animalia
- Phylum: Arthropoda
- Class: Insecta
- Order: Coleoptera
- Suborder: Polyphaga
- Infraorder: Cucujiformia
- Family: Cerambycidae
- Genus: Agnia
- Species: A. eximia

Binomial name
- Agnia eximia Pascoe, 1860

Species of beetle

Agnia eximia is a species of beetle in the family Cerambycidae. It was described by Francis Polkinghorne Pascoe in 1860. It is known from Moluccas.

== Varietas ==
- Agnia eximia var. abasomaculata Gressitt, 1950
- Agnia eximia var. albofasciata Breuning, 1944
