= Saprosites dentipes =

Scientific classification
- Kingdom: Animalia
- Phylum: Arthropoda
- Clade: Pancrustacea
- Class: Insecta
- Order: Coleoptera
- Suborder: Polyphaga
- Infraorder: Scarabaeiformia
- Family: Scarabaeidae
- Genus: Saprosites
- Species: S. dentipes

Binomial name
- Saprosites dentipes Harold, 1867

Synonyms
- Saprosites ataenoides Balthasar, 1945; Saprosites granulifrons Balthasar, 1938

Species of beetle

Saprosites dentipes is a species of beetle of the family Scarabaeidae. It is found in Argentina, Brazil (Espírito Santo, Minas Gerais, Rio de Janeiro, Rio Grande do Sul, Santa Catarina, São Paulo), Colombia and Peru.

== Description ==
Adults reach a length of about 5–6 mm (0.20–0.24 in). The clypeus is transversely carinate behind the medial emargination and the frons is coarsely punctate. The pronotum has minute and coarse punctures. The lateral striae on the elytra are thinner than the lateral interstriae.
