= Saprosites javanus =

Scientific classification
- Kingdom: Animalia
- Phylum: Arthropoda
- Clade: Pancrustacea
- Class: Insecta
- Order: Coleoptera
- Suborder: Polyphaga
- Infraorder: Scarabaeiformia
- Family: Scarabaeidae
- Genus: Saprosites
- Species: S. javanus

Binomial name
- Saprosites javanus Balthasar, 1941

Species of beetle

Saprosites javanus is a species of beetle of the family Scarabaeidae. It is found in Indonesia (Java, Sumatra).

== Description ==
Adults reach a length of about 3.8–4 mm (0.15–0.16 in). They have a brownish-black or black, strongly shiny, almost parallel-sided body.
