= Saprosites raffrayi =

Scientific classification
- Kingdom: Animalia
- Phylum: Arthropoda
- Clade: Pancrustacea
- Class: Insecta
- Order: Coleoptera
- Suborder: Polyphaga
- Infraorder: Scarabaeiformia
- Family: Scarabaeidae
- Genus: Saprosites
- Species: S. raffrayi

Binomial name
- Saprosites raffrayi Paulian, 1944

Species of beetle

Saprosites raffrayi is a species of beetle of the family Scarabaeidae. It is found in Malaysia (Sabah, Malacca) and Singapore.

== Description ==
Adults reach a length of about 4.5–4.8 mm (0.18–0.19 in). They have a cylindrical, convex, shining black body.
