= Saprosites mahavus =

Scientific classification
- Kingdom: Animalia
- Phylum: Arthropoda
- Clade: Pancrustacea
- Class: Insecta
- Order: Coleoptera
- Suborder: Polyphaga
- Infraorder: Scarabaeiformia
- Family: Scarabaeidae
- Genus: Saprosites
- Species: S. mahavus

Binomial name
- Saprosites mahavus Stebnicka, 2012

Species of beetle

Saprosites mahavus is a species of beetle of the family Scarabaeidae. It is found in Indonesia (Sulawesi).

== Description ==
Adults reach a length of about 2.8–3.2 mm (0.11–0.13 in). They have an oblong-oval, piceous, shining body, with reddish legs.
