= Saprosites laeviceps =

Scientific classification
- Kingdom: Animalia
- Phylum: Arthropoda
- Clade: Pancrustacea
- Class: Insecta
- Order: Coleoptera
- Suborder: Polyphaga
- Infraorder: Scarabaeiformia
- Family: Scarabaeidae
- Genus: Saprosites
- Species: S. laeviceps

Binomial name
- Saprosites laeviceps Harold, 1877

Species of beetle

Saprosites laeviceps is a species of beetle of the family Scarabaeidae. It is found in Indonesia (Sumatra, Sumbawa) and Malaysia (Sabah).

== Description ==
Adults reach a length of about 5–6 mm (0.20–0.24 in). They have a not quite parallel-sided, rufous to piceous, shining body.
