= Saprosites calvus =

Scientific classification
- Kingdom: Animalia
- Phylum: Arthropoda
- Clade: Pancrustacea
- Class: Insecta
- Order: Coleoptera
- Suborder: Polyphaga
- Infraorder: Scarabaeiformia
- Family: Scarabaeidae
- Genus: Saprosites
- Species: S. calvus

Binomial name
- Saprosites calvus Schmidt, 1910

Species of beetle

Saprosites calvus is a species of beetle of the family Scarabaeidae. It is found in Equatorial Guinea (Fernando Poo) and the Democratic Republic of the Congo.

== Description ==
Adults reach a length of about 2.5 mm (0.098 in). They have a short, broad, dark reddish-brown body.
