= Marmaroglypha sumatrana =

Scientific classification
- Domain: Eukaryota
- Kingdom: Animalia
- Phylum: Arthropoda
- Class: Insecta
- Order: Coleoptera
- Suborder: Polyphaga
- Infraorder: Cucujiformia
- Family: Cerambycidae
- Tribe: Lamiini
- Genus: Marmaroglypha
- Species: M. sumatrana

Binomial name
- Marmaroglypha sumatrana Ritsema, 1888

Species of beetle

Marmaroglypha sumatrana is a species of beetle in the family Cerambycidae. It was described by Coenraad Ritsema in 1888. It is known from Sumatra.
