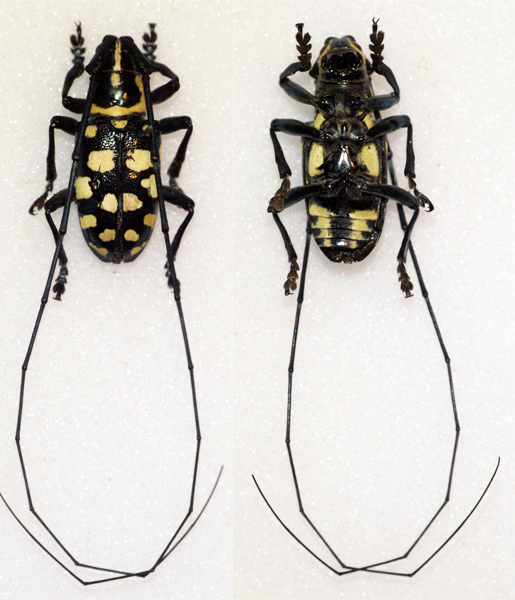

Scientific classification
- Domain: Eukaryota
- Kingdom: Animalia
- Phylum: Arthropoda
- Class: Insecta
- Order: Coleoptera
- Suborder: Polyphaga
- Infraorder: Cucujiformia
- Family: Cerambycidae
- Tribe: Lamiini
- Genus: Agnia
- Species: A. pulchra

Binomial name
- Agnia pulchra Aurivillius, 1891

= Agnia pulchra =

Species of beetle

Agnia pulchra is a species of beetle in the family Cerambycidae. It was described by Per Olof Christopher Aurivillius in 1891. It is known from the Philippines. It contains the variety Agnia pulchra var. sulphureomaculata.
