= Saprosites wauensis =

Scientific classification
- Kingdom: Animalia
- Phylum: Arthropoda
- Clade: Pancrustacea
- Class: Insecta
- Order: Coleoptera
- Suborder: Polyphaga
- Infraorder: Scarabaeiformia
- Family: Scarabaeidae
- Genus: Saprosites
- Species: S. wauensis

Binomial name
- Saprosites wauensis Stebnicka, 1984

Species of beetle

Saprosites wauensis is a species of beetle of the family Scarabaeidae. It is found in Papua New Guinea and Indonesia (Irian Jaya).

== Description ==
Adults reach a length of about 3.5–3.9 mm (0.14–0.15 in). They have a robust, strongly shiny, black or reddish brown body.
