= Saprosites cariniceps =

Scientific classification
- Kingdom: Animalia
- Phylum: Arthropoda
- Clade: Pancrustacea
- Class: Insecta
- Order: Coleoptera
- Suborder: Polyphaga
- Infraorder: Scarabaeiformia
- Family: Scarabaeidae
- Genus: Saprosites
- Species: S. cariniceps

Binomial name
- Saprosites cariniceps Pittino, 2008

Species of beetle

Saprosites cariniceps is a species of beetle of the family Scarabaeidae. It is found in Peninsular Malaysia.

== Description ==
Adults reach a length of about 4–4.2 mm (0.16–0.17 in). They have a brownish-black, shiny body.
