= Saprosites laticollis =

Scientific classification
- Kingdom: Animalia
- Phylum: Arthropoda
- Clade: Pancrustacea
- Class: Insecta
- Order: Coleoptera
- Suborder: Polyphaga
- Infraorder: Scarabaeiformia
- Family: Scarabaeidae
- Genus: Saprosites
- Species: S. laticollis

Binomial name
- Saprosites laticollis Pittino, 2008

Species of beetle

Saprosites laticollis is a species of beetle of the family Scarabaeidae. It is found in Malaysia (Sabah).

== Description ==
Adults reach a length of about 3.3–4.1 mm (0.13–0.16 in). They have a short, robust, reddish-black body.
