= Saprosites catenatus =

Scientific classification
- Kingdom: Animalia
- Phylum: Arthropoda
- Clade: Pancrustacea
- Class: Insecta
- Order: Coleoptera
- Suborder: Polyphaga
- Infraorder: Scarabaeiformia
- Family: Scarabaeidae
- Genus: Saprosites
- Species: S. catenatus

Binomial name
- Saprosites catenatus (Fauvel, 1903)

Synonyms
- Psammobius catenatus Fauvel, 1903

Species of beetle

Saprosites catenatus is a species of beetle of the family Scarabaeidae. It is found in New Caledonia.

== Description ==
Adults reach a length of about 3.4–3.6 mm (0.13–0.14 in). They have a convex, glabrous, glossy body, with cylindrical elytra. They are dark reddish-brown, with the anterior and lateral margins of the clypeus and the anterior angles of the pronotum paler and with reddish-brown legs.
