= Saprosites mansuetus =

Scientific classification
- Kingdom: Animalia
- Phylum: Arthropoda
- Clade: Pancrustacea
- Class: Insecta
- Order: Coleoptera
- Suborder: Polyphaga
- Infraorder: Scarabaeiformia
- Family: Scarabaeidae
- Genus: Saprosites
- Species: S. mansuetus

Binomial name
- Saprosites mansuetus Blackburn, 1904

Species of beetle

Saprosites mansuetus is a species of beetle of the family Scarabaeidae. It is found in Australia (Western Australia).

== Description ==
Adults reach a length of about 3–3.5 mm (0.12–0.14 in). They have a castaneous to reddish body, with reddish legs.
