= Saprosites breviusculus =

Scientific classification
- Kingdom: Animalia
- Phylum: Arthropoda
- Clade: Pancrustacea
- Class: Insecta
- Order: Coleoptera
- Suborder: Polyphaga
- Infraorder: Scarabaeiformia
- Family: Scarabaeidae
- Genus: Saprosites
- Species: S. breviusculus

Binomial name
- Saprosites breviusculus Harold, 1867

Synonyms
- Saprosites ohausi Schmidt, 1910

Species of beetle

Saprosites breviusculus is a species of beetle of the family Scarabaeidae. It is found in Argentina, Bolivia, Brazil (Espírito Santo, Mato Grosso, Minas Gerais, Pará, Rio de Janeiro, Rio Grande do Sul, Santa Catarina, São Paulo), Colombia, Ecuador, French Guiana, Guyana, Paraguay, Suriname and Venezuela.

== Description ==
Adults reach a length of about 3–4 mm (0.12–0.16 in). The head is punctate, with the punctures minute near the anterior margin of the clypeus and fine near and on the frons. The pronotum is quadrate and densely punctate with fine and coarse punctures. The lateral interstriae on the elytra are less coarsely punctate than the discal interstriae. The abdominal ventrites are coarsely and densely punctate.

== Life history ==
This species has been collected inside rotten logs, litter and sticks with fungus at altitudes ranging from 111 to 760 metres.
