= Saprosites kinabalu =

Scientific classification
- Kingdom: Animalia
- Phylum: Arthropoda
- Clade: Pancrustacea
- Class: Insecta
- Order: Coleoptera
- Suborder: Polyphaga
- Infraorder: Scarabaeiformia
- Family: Scarabaeidae
- Genus: Saprosites
- Species: S. kinabalu

Binomial name
- Saprosites kinabalu Pittino, 2008

Species of beetle

Saprosites kinabalu is a species of beetle of the family Scarabaeidae. It is found in Malaysia (Sabah).

== Description ==
Adults reach a length of about 4.5–5.3 mm (0.18–0.21 in). They have a shiny, brownish black to dark reddish-brown body.
