= Saprosites bangueyensis =

Scientific classification
- Kingdom: Animalia
- Phylum: Arthropoda
- Clade: Pancrustacea
- Class: Insecta
- Order: Coleoptera
- Suborder: Polyphaga
- Infraorder: Scarabaeiformia
- Family: Scarabaeidae
- Genus: Saprosites
- Species: S. bangueyensis

Binomial name
- Saprosites bangueyensis Paulian, 1944

Species of beetle

Saprosites bangueyensis is a species of beetle of the family Scarabaeidae. It is found in Indonesia (Irian Jaya) and Malaysia (Banguey Island).

== Description ==
Adults reach a length of about 2.5–2.6 mm (0.098–0.102 in). They have a slender, castaneous, shining body.
