= Saprosites mendax =

Scientific classification
- Kingdom: Animalia
- Phylum: Arthropoda
- Clade: Pancrustacea
- Class: Insecta
- Order: Coleoptera
- Suborder: Polyphaga
- Infraorder: Scarabaeiformia
- Family: Scarabaeidae
- Genus: Saprosites
- Species: S. mendax

Binomial name
- Saprosites mendax (Blackburn, 1892)

Synonyms
- Ataenius mendax Blackburn, 1892; Saprosites punctatus Richards, 1959

Species of beetle

Saprosites mendax is a species of beetle of the family Scarabaeidae. It is found in Australia (Australian Capital Territory, New South Wales, Tasmania, Victoria) and New Zealand. It was introduced to Great Britain.

== Description ==
Adults reach a length of about 3.2–3.5 mm (0.13–0.14 in). They have a black, castaneous or rusty brown body.

== Life history ==
Specimens have been collected in soil, decayed wood, compost, leaf litter, carrion, as well as under bark.
