= Saprosites communis =

Scientific classification
- Kingdom: Animalia
- Phylum: Arthropoda
- Clade: Pancrustacea
- Class: Insecta
- Order: Coleoptera
- Suborder: Polyphaga
- Infraorder: Scarabaeiformia
- Family: Scarabaeidae
- Genus: Saprosites
- Species: S. communis

Binomial name
- Saprosites communis (Broun, 1880)

Synonyms
- Aphodius communis Broun, 1880

Species of beetle

Saprosites communis is a species of beetle of the family Scarabaeidae. It is found in New Zealand.

== Description ==
Adults reach a length of about 3–3.5 mm (0.12–0.14 in). They have a parallel-sided, shiny, reddish black to black body.

== Life history ==
Specimens have been collected in leaf litter, decaying wood, under bark and stones, as well as on fungi and in moss.
