= Saprosites kapitensis =

Scientific classification
- Kingdom: Animalia
- Phylum: Arthropoda
- Clade: Pancrustacea
- Class: Insecta
- Order: Coleoptera
- Suborder: Polyphaga
- Infraorder: Scarabaeiformia
- Family: Scarabaeidae
- Genus: Saprosites
- Species: S. kapitensis

Binomial name
- Saprosites kapitensis Petrovitz, 1973

Species of beetle

Saprosites kapitensis is a species of beetle of the family Scarabaeidae. It is found in Indonesia (Sulawesi) and Malaysia (Sarawak).

== Description ==
Adults reach a length of about 4.8–4.9 mm (0.19–0.19 in). They have a parallel-sided, shining black body.
