= Saprosites crockerensis =

Scientific classification
- Kingdom: Animalia
- Phylum: Arthropoda
- Clade: Pancrustacea
- Class: Insecta
- Order: Coleoptera
- Suborder: Polyphaga
- Infraorder: Scarabaeiformia
- Family: Scarabaeidae
- Genus: Saprosites
- Species: S. crockerensis

Binomial name
- Saprosites crockerensis Stebnicka, 1991

Species of beetle

Saprosites crockerensis is a species of beetle of the family Scarabaeidae. It is found in Malaysia (Sabah).

== Description ==
Adults reach a length of about 5.5–5.8 mm (0.22–0.23 in). They have a subparallel, piceous to black, shining body.
