= Saprosites fortipes =

Scientific classification
- Kingdom: Animalia
- Phylum: Arthropoda
- Clade: Pancrustacea
- Class: Insecta
- Order: Coleoptera
- Suborder: Polyphaga
- Infraorder: Scarabaeiformia
- Family: Scarabaeidae
- Genus: Saprosites
- Species: S. fortipes

Binomial name
- Saprosites fortipes (Broun, 1886)

Synonyms
- Aphodius fortipes Broun, 1886

Species of beetle

Saprosites fortipes is a species of beetle of the family Scarabaeidae. It is found in New Zealand.

== Description ==
Adults reach a length of about 2.5–3.3 mm (0.098–0.130 in). They have a elongate-oval, shiny, reddish black to black or rusty brown body.

== Life history ==
Specimens have been collected under logs and in leaf litter.
