= Saprosites deharvengi =

Scientific classification
- Kingdom: Animalia
- Phylum: Arthropoda
- Clade: Pancrustacea
- Class: Insecta
- Order: Coleoptera
- Suborder: Polyphaga
- Infraorder: Scarabaeiformia
- Family: Scarabaeidae
- Genus: Saprosites
- Species: S. deharvengi

Binomial name
- Saprosites deharvengi Bordat & Théry, 2012

Species of beetle

Saprosites deharvengi is a species of beetle of the family Scarabaeidae. It is found in New Caledonia.

== Description ==
Adults reach a length of about 2–2.5 mm (0.079–0.098 in). They have a convex, shiny, glabrous, dark reddish-brown body, with the front of the head and the elytra paler and the legs reddish-brown.

== Etymology ==
The species is named in honour of Collembola specialist Louis Deharveng, who first discovered the species.
