= Saprosites madagascariensis =

Scientific classification
- Kingdom: Animalia
- Phylum: Arthropoda
- Clade: Pancrustacea
- Class: Insecta
- Order: Coleoptera
- Suborder: Polyphaga
- Infraorder: Scarabaeiformia
- Family: Scarabaeidae
- Genus: Saprosites
- Species: S. madagascariensis

Binomial name
- Saprosites madagascariensis Schmidt, 1910

Synonyms
- Saprosites attenuatus Schmidt, 1922

Species of beetle

Saprosites madagascariensis is a species of beetle of the family Scarabaeidae. It is found in Madagascar.

== Description ==
Adults reach a length of about 4 mm (0.16 in). They have an elongate, blackish body, with lighter edges on the head and thorax.
