= Saprosites clydensis =

Scientific classification
- Kingdom: Animalia
- Phylum: Arthropoda
- Clade: Pancrustacea
- Class: Insecta
- Order: Coleoptera
- Suborder: Polyphaga
- Infraorder: Scarabaeiformia
- Family: Scarabaeidae
- Genus: Saprosites
- Species: S. clydensis

Binomial name
- Saprosites clydensis Stebnicka & Howden, 1996

Species of beetle

Saprosites clydensis is a species of beetle of the family Scarabaeidae. It is found in Australia (Australian Capital Territory, New South Wales, Victoria).

== Description ==
Adults reach a length of about 3–3.5 mm (0.12–0.14 in). They have a shining black body, with the anterior of the head and legs reddish-brown.
