= Saprosites rougemonti =

Scientific classification
- Kingdom: Animalia
- Phylum: Arthropoda
- Clade: Pancrustacea
- Class: Insecta
- Order: Coleoptera
- Suborder: Polyphaga
- Infraorder: Scarabaeiformia
- Family: Scarabaeidae
- Genus: Saprosites
- Species: S. rougemonti

Binomial name
- Saprosites rougemonti Pittino, 2008

Species of beetle

Saprosites rougemonti is a species of beetle of the family Scarabaeidae. It is found in Peninsular Malaysia.

== Description ==
Adults reach a length of about 4.6–5.2 mm (0.18–0.20 in). They have a shining black body, with the ventral surface reddish-brown.
