= Saprosites yanoi =

Scientific classification
- Kingdom: Animalia
- Phylum: Arthropoda
- Clade: Pancrustacea
- Class: Insecta
- Order: Coleoptera
- Suborder: Polyphaga
- Infraorder: Scarabaeiformia
- Family: Scarabaeidae
- Genus: Saprosites
- Species: S. yanoi

Binomial name
- Saprosites yanoi Nomura, 1939

Species of beetle

Saprosites yanoi is a species of beetle of the family Scarabaeidae. It is found in Taiwan.

== Description ==
Adults reach a length of about 4.5 mm (0.18 in). They have a parallel-sided, black body.
