= Saprosites rufus =

Scientific classification
- Kingdom: Animalia
- Phylum: Arthropoda
- Clade: Pancrustacea
- Class: Insecta
- Order: Coleoptera
- Suborder: Polyphaga
- Infraorder: Scarabaeiformia
- Family: Scarabaeidae
- Genus: Saprosites
- Species: S. rufus

Binomial name
- Saprosites rufus Paulian, 1944

Species of beetle

Saprosites rufus is a species of beetle of the family Scarabaeidae. It is found in Indonesia (Sumatra) and Malaysia (Peninsular, Sarawak).

== Description ==
Adults reach a length of about 2.8–3 mm (0.11–0.12 in). They have a parallel-sided, rufous to castaneous, shiny body.
