= Saprosites degallieri =

Scientific classification
- Kingdom: Animalia
- Phylum: Arthropoda
- Clade: Pancrustacea
- Class: Insecta
- Order: Coleoptera
- Suborder: Polyphaga
- Infraorder: Scarabaeiformia
- Family: Scarabaeidae
- Genus: Saprosites
- Species: S. degallieri

Binomial name
- Saprosites degallieri Bordat & Théry, 2012

Species of beetle

Saprosites degallieri is a species of beetle of the family Scarabaeidae. It is found in New Caledonia.

== Description ==
Adults reach a length of about 3.9 mm (0.15 in). They have a convex, shiny, glabrous, blackish-brown body, with the margins of the head and the anterior angles of the pronotum slightly paler and with the legs dark reddish-brown.

== Etymology ==
The species is named in honour of Histeridae specialist Nicolas Dégallier, who first discovered the species.
