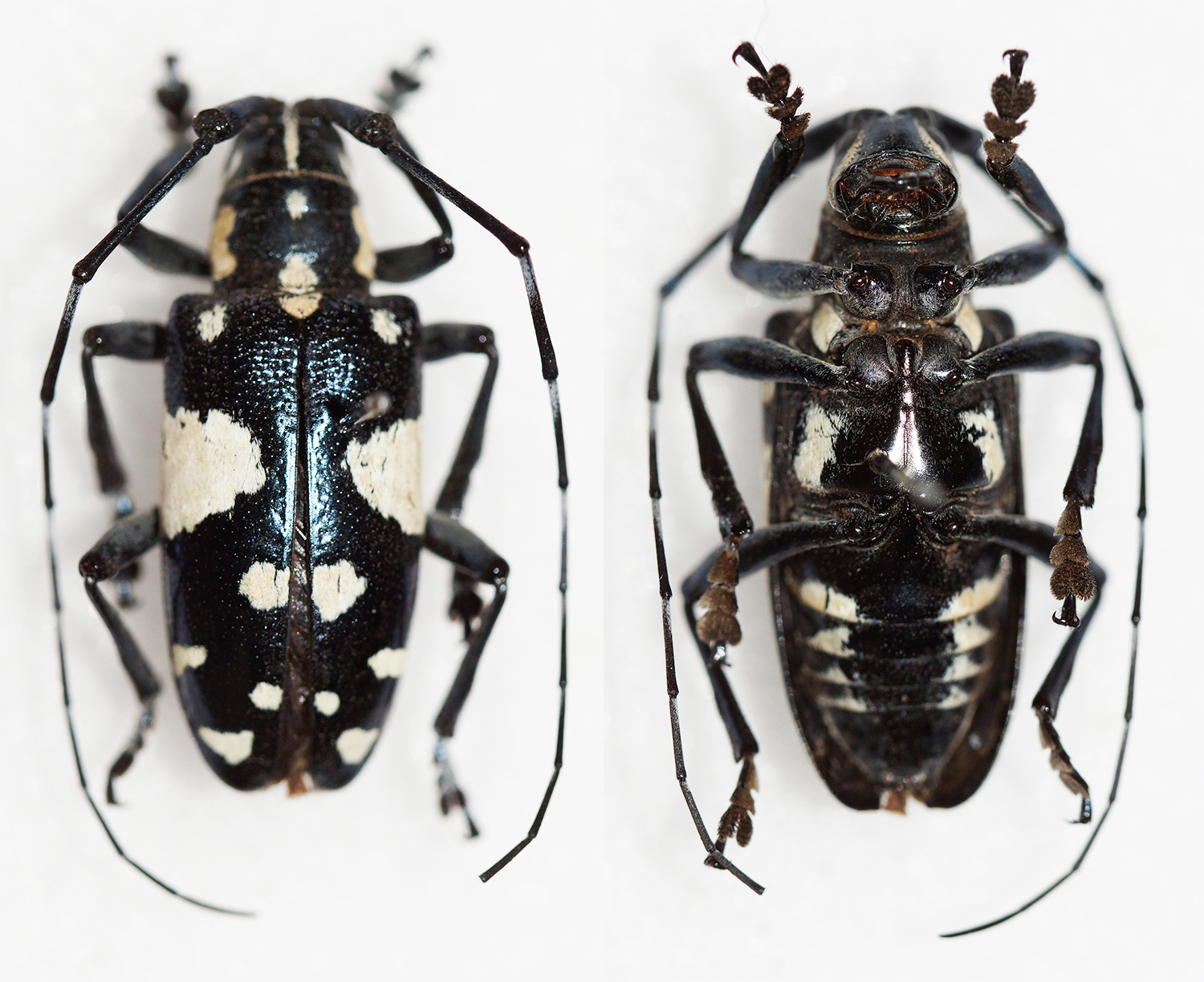

Scientific classification
- Domain: Eukaryota
- Kingdom: Animalia
- Phylum: Arthropoda
- Class: Insecta
- Order: Coleoptera
- Suborder: Polyphaga
- Infraorder: Cucujiformia
- Family: Cerambycidae
- Tribe: Lamiini
- Genus: Agnia
- Species: A. casta

Binomial name
- Agnia casta Newman, 1842

Synonyms
- Agnia incasta Heller, 1923

= Agnia casta =

Species of beetle

Agnia casta is a species of beetle in the family Cerambycidae. It was described by Newman in 1842. It is known from the Philippines.
