= Saprosites mjoebergi =

Scientific classification
- Kingdom: Animalia
- Phylum: Arthropoda
- Clade: Pancrustacea
- Class: Insecta
- Order: Coleoptera
- Suborder: Polyphaga
- Infraorder: Scarabaeiformia
- Family: Scarabaeidae
- Genus: Saprosites
- Species: S. mjoebergi

Binomial name
- Saprosites mjoebergi Gillet, 1924

Synonyms
- Saprosites fruhstorferi Paulian, 1944

Species of beetle

Saprosites mjoebergi is a species of beetle of the family Scarabaeidae. It is found in Indonesia (Sumatra, Sulawesi).

== Description ==
Adults reach a length of about 2.9–3 mm (0.11–0.12 in). They have a carbon black, shiny body.
