= Saprosites verecundus =

Scientific classification
- Kingdom: Animalia
- Phylum: Arthropoda
- Clade: Pancrustacea
- Class: Insecta
- Order: Coleoptera
- Suborder: Polyphaga
- Infraorder: Scarabaeiformia
- Family: Scarabaeidae
- Genus: Saprosites
- Species: S. verecundus

Binomial name
- Saprosites verecundus Schmidt, 1909

Synonyms
- Saprosites malaisei Paulian, 1944

Species of beetle

Saprosites verecundus is a species of beetle of the family Scarabaeidae. It is found in Indonesia (Sumatra, Java, Sulawesi, Kalimantan, Irian Jaya, Mentawei Islands), Malaysia (Sabah), the Philippines and Thailand.

== Description ==
Adults reach a length of about 3.8–4.3 mm (0.15–0.17 in). They have a parallel-sided, light to dark castaneous, strongly shining body.
