= Saprosites declivis =

Scientific classification
- Kingdom: Animalia
- Phylum: Arthropoda
- Clade: Pancrustacea
- Class: Insecta
- Order: Coleoptera
- Suborder: Polyphaga
- Infraorder: Scarabaeiformia
- Family: Scarabaeidae
- Genus: Saprosites
- Species: S. declivis

Binomial name
- Saprosites declivis Schmidt, 1910

Species of beetle

Saprosites declivis is a species of beetle of the family Scarabaeidae. It is found in Equatorial Guinea (Fernando Poo) and Gabon.

== Description ==
Adults reach a length of about 3 mm (0.12 in). They have an elongate, weakly convex, blackish-brown body, with the legs lighter. The upper surface is slightly shiny.
