= Saprosites mesosternalis =

Scientific classification
- Kingdom: Animalia
- Phylum: Arthropoda
- Clade: Pancrustacea
- Class: Insecta
- Order: Coleoptera
- Suborder: Polyphaga
- Infraorder: Scarabaeiformia
- Family: Scarabaeidae
- Genus: Saprosites
- Species: S. mesosternalis

Binomial name
- Saprosites mesosternalis Lea, 1923

Species of beetle

Saprosites mesosternalis is a species of beetle of the family Scarabaeidae. It is found in Australia (Lord Howe Island).

== Description ==
Adults reach a length of about 3.5–4.2 mm (0.14–0.17 in). They have a robust, dark castaneous body, although lighter in some specimens. The disc of the pronotum and the elytral striae are usually darker.
