= Saprosites celebicus =

Scientific classification
- Kingdom: Animalia
- Phylum: Arthropoda
- Clade: Pancrustacea
- Class: Insecta
- Order: Coleoptera
- Suborder: Polyphaga
- Infraorder: Scarabaeiformia
- Family: Scarabaeidae
- Genus: Saprosites
- Species: S. celebicus

Binomial name
- Saprosites celebicus Paulian, 1944

Synonyms
- Saprosites jacobsoni Paulian, 1944; Saprosites coelebicus

Species of beetle

Saprosites celebicus is a species of beetle of the family Scarabaeidae. It is found in Indonesia (Sulawesi, Sumatra) and Malaysia (Sabah).

== Description ==
Adults reach a length of about 4.2–5.2 mm (0.17–0.20 in). They have a convex, piceous to black, shiny body.
