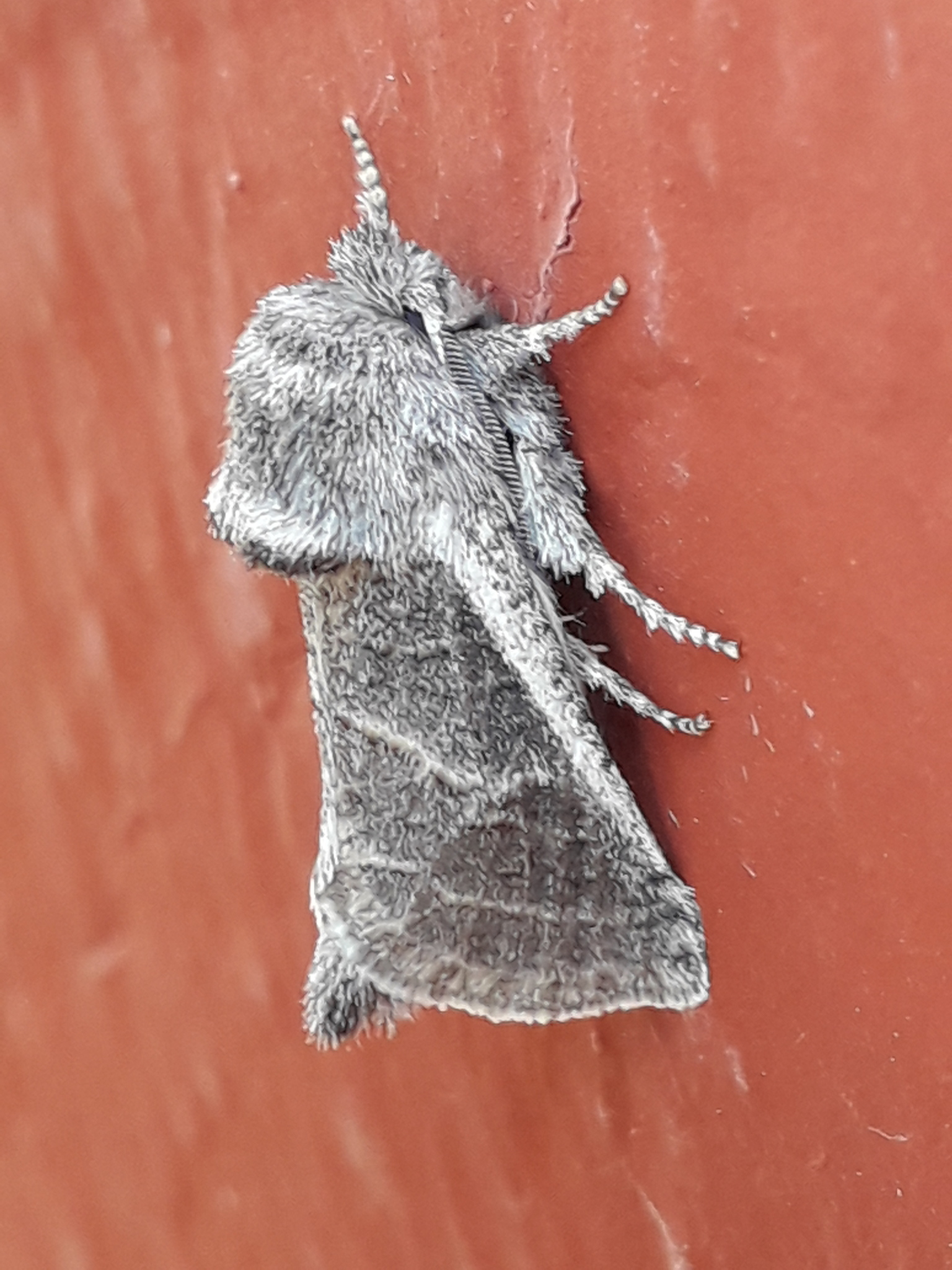

Scientific classification
- Kingdom: Animalia
- Phylum: Arthropoda
- Clade: Pancrustacea
- Class: Insecta
- Order: Lepidoptera
- Family: Cossidae
- Genus: Comadia
- Species: C. redtenbacheri

Binomial name
- Comadia redtenbacheri (Hammerschmidt, 1848)

Synonyms
- Zeuzera redtenbacheri Hammerschmidt, 1848; Hypopta redtenbacheri; Bombyx agavis Blasquez, 1870; Comadia agavis; Hypopta chilodora Dyar, 1910

= Comadia redtenbacheri =

Species of moth

Comadia redtenbacheri, also known as the agave redworm moth, is a moth in the family Cossidae. It is found in North America, where it has been recorded in Mexico and southern Texas.

The moth was first named in 1848 by Austrian entomologist Carl Eduard Hammerschmidt (1800–1874) in honour of his colleague Ludwig Redtenbacher (1814–1876).

The length of the forewings is 12–14 mm for males and 13–16 mm for females. Adults have been recorded on wing from April to May and in September. The moth lays its eggs near the base of the Agave leaves.

It is widely used in its larval form as the "worm" in mezcal. The rising popularity of mezcal could potentially subject the moth to overharvesting.

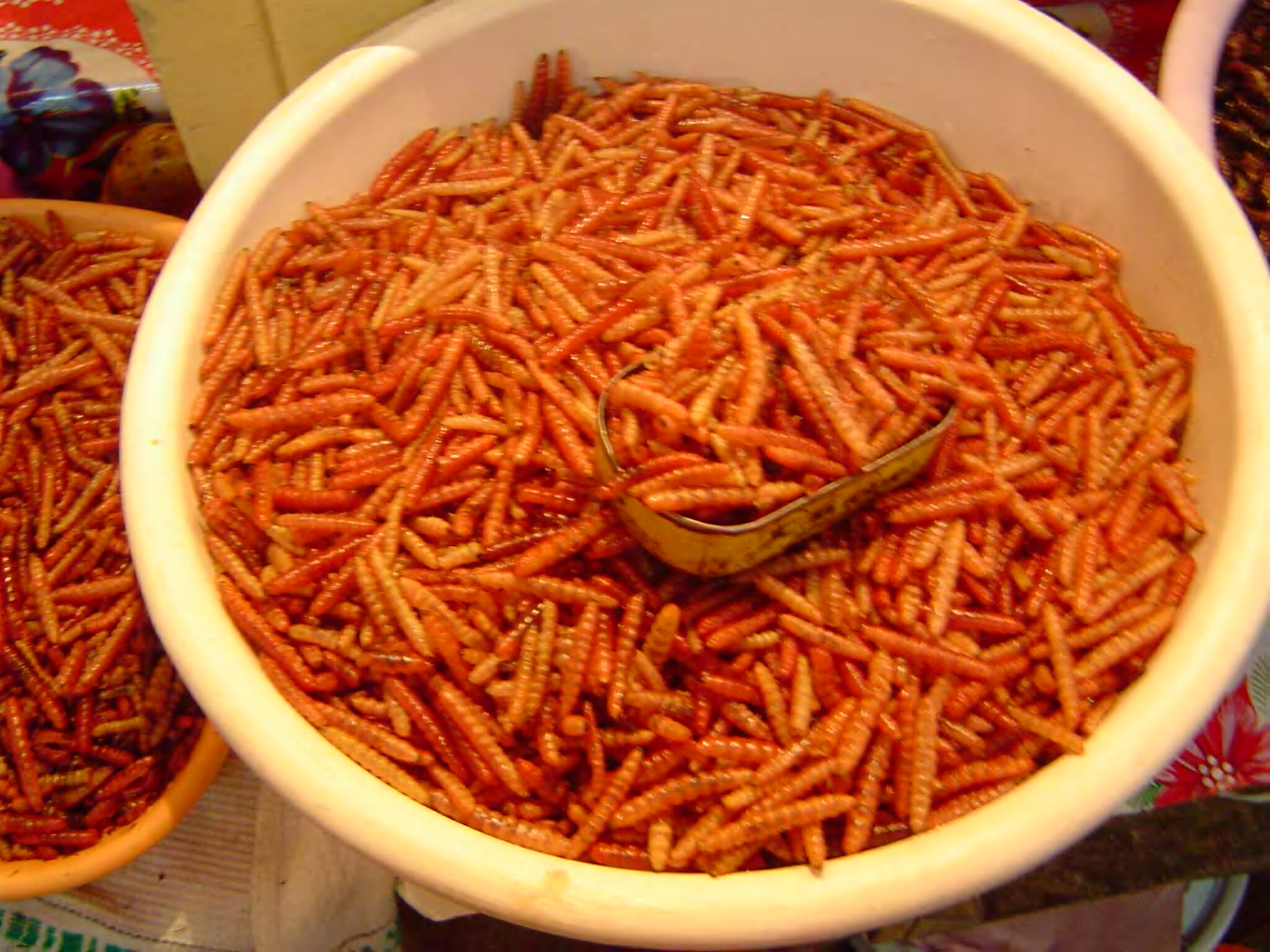
A dish of roasted chinicuiles in a market in Tula de Allende, Mexico

== See also ==
- Aegiale hesperiaris
