= Saprosites dudichi =

Scientific classification
- Kingdom: Animalia
- Phylum: Arthropoda
- Clade: Pancrustacea
- Class: Insecta
- Order: Coleoptera
- Suborder: Polyphaga
- Infraorder: Scarabaeiformia
- Family: Scarabaeidae
- Genus: Saprosites
- Species: S. dudichi

Binomial name
- Saprosites dudichi Endrödi, 1951

Species of beetle

Saprosites dudichi is a species of beetle of the family Scarabaeidae. It is found in Papua New Guinea and Indonesia (Irian Jaya).

== Description ==
Adults reach a length of about 3–3.1 mm (0.12–0.12 in). They have an oblong-oval, shiny, rufous body.
