= Carl Eduard Hammerschmidt =

Austrian scientist

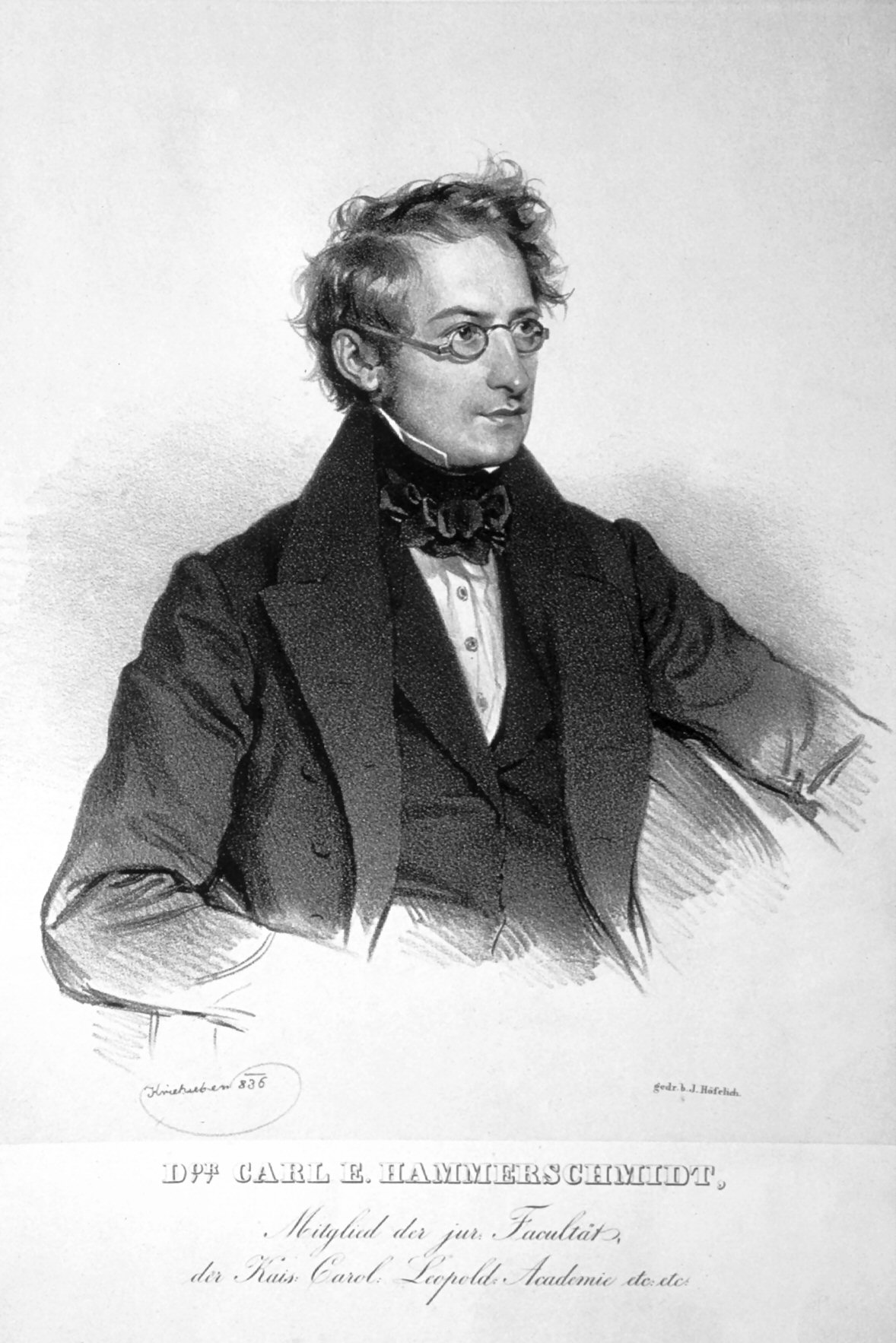

Karl Eduard Hammerschmidt, also known as Abdullah Bey (1800 – 30 August 1874), was an Austrian mineralogist, entomologist and medical doctor.

== Life ==
Hammerschmidt was born in 1800 in Vienna. He took a law degree in Vienna in 1827. He also studied medicine, with an emphasis on anesthesiology, and served until 1848 as the editor of the Landwirtschaftliche Zeitung, an agricultural newspaper published in Vienna.

In 1848 he named comadia redtenbacheri, known as the caterpillar placed in bottles of mezcal, in honour of his colleague Ludwig Redtenbacher (1814–1876).

After the Revolution of 1848, Hammerschmidt fled Vienna to fight under the Polish general Józef Bem. Along with other revolutionaries from Hungary, he entered Turkey, and soon thereafter was employed as a teacher of medicine, zoology, and mineralogy in the medical school of Constantinople. Austria demanded that Turkey deport him, whereupon Hammerschmidt moved to Damascus, where he worked as a hospital doctor. He served in the Turkish army during the Crimean War.

In 1873, Hammerschmidt joined the faculty of medicine in Istanbul, teaching geology, mineralogy, and zoology. He founded the Natural History Museum of the Imperial Medical School of Constantinople, and was among the founders of the Turkish Red Crescent.

Hammerschmidt converted to Islam and assumed the name "Abdullah Bey." He died on 30 August 1874 in the course of geological surveys for a new railway in Anatolia.

== Works ==
- Beschreibung eines neuen mexicanischen Schmetterlinges (Cossus) Redtenbacheri Hmrschdt., dessen Entwickelung in Wien beobachtet wurde, mit 1 lith. Tafel. Wien, 1847
- Helminthologische Beiträge, Beschreibung einiger neuer in Insekten entdeckten Oxyuris-Arten. Wien, 1847.
- Beschreibung einiger Oxyuris-Arten. In: Naturwissenschaftliche Abhandlungen, 1 (1847).
