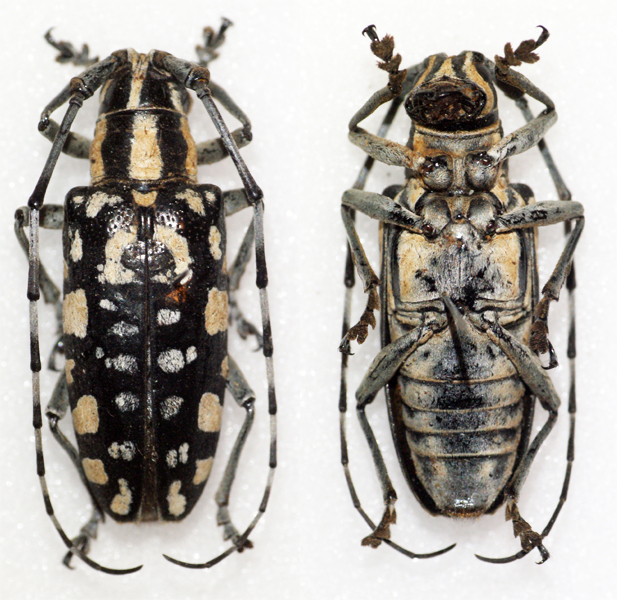

Scientific classification
- Domain: Eukaryota
- Kingdom: Animalia
- Phylum: Arthropoda
- Class: Insecta
- Order: Coleoptera
- Suborder: Polyphaga
- Infraorder: Cucujiformia
- Family: Cerambycidae
- Tribe: Lamiini
- Genus: Agnia
- Species: A. clara

Binomial name
- Agnia clara Newman, 1842

Synonyms
- Lubentia voluptuosa Thomson, 1857

= Agnia clara =

Species of beetle

Agnia clara is a species of beetle in the family Cerambycidae. It was described by Newman in 1842. It is known from the Philippines. It feeds on Theobroma cacao.
