= Saprosites rufopolitus =

Scientific classification
- Kingdom: Animalia
- Phylum: Arthropoda
- Clade: Pancrustacea
- Class: Insecta
- Order: Coleoptera
- Suborder: Polyphaga
- Infraorder: Scarabaeiformia
- Family: Scarabaeidae
- Genus: Saprosites
- Species: S. rufopolitus

Binomial name
- Saprosites rufopolitus Gillet, 1924

Species of beetle

Saprosites rufopolitus is a species of beetle of the family Scarabaeidae. It is found in Indonesia (Sumatra, Java), Malaysia (Peninsular Malaysia, Sabah), the Philippines and Thailand.

== Description ==
Adults reach a length of about 2.5–3.2 mm (0.098–0.126 in). They have a parallel-sided, reddish brown, shining body.
