= Saprosites castaneus =

Scientific classification
- Kingdom: Animalia
- Phylum: Arthropoda
- Clade: Pancrustacea
- Class: Insecta
- Order: Coleoptera
- Suborder: Polyphaga
- Infraorder: Scarabaeiformia
- Family: Scarabaeidae
- Genus: Saprosites
- Species: S. castaneus

Binomial name
- Saprosites castaneus Lea, 1923

Species of beetle

Saprosites castaneus is a species of beetle of the family Scarabaeidae. It is found in Australia (Lord Howe Island).

== Description ==
Adults reach a length of about 2.8–3 mm (0.11–0.12 in). They have a parallel-sided, shining, red-castaneous body, with the frontal suture and the elytral striae darker.
