= Mesoprionus persicus =

Scientific classification
- Kingdom: Animalia
- Phylum: Arthropoda
- Class: Insecta
- Order: Coleoptera
- Suborder: Polyphaga
- Infraorder: Cucujiformia
- Family: Cerambycidae
- Genus: Mesoprionus
- Species: M. persicus

Binomial name
- Mesoprionus persicus (Redtenbacher, 1850)

Species of beetle

Mesoprionus persicus is a species of beetle in the subfamily Prioninae, that is endemic to Zagros, Iran. The species is 20–32 millimetres (0.79–1.26 in) in length and is black coloured. They feed on Quercus brantii.
