= Saprosites nitidicollis =

Scientific classification
- Kingdom: Animalia
- Phylum: Arthropoda
- Clade: Pancrustacea
- Class: Insecta
- Order: Coleoptera
- Suborder: Polyphaga
- Infraorder: Scarabaeiformia
- Family: Scarabaeidae
- Genus: Saprosites
- Species: S. nitidicollis

Binomial name
- Saprosites nitidicollis (MacLeay, 1871)

Synonyms
- Ammoecius nitidicollis MacLeay, 1871

Species of beetle

Saprosites nitidicollis is a species of beetle of the family Scarabaeidae. It is found in Australia (New South Wales, Queensland).

== Description ==
Adults reach a length of about 3–4 mm (0.12–0.16 in). They have a black, dark castaneous or rusty brown body.

== Life history ==
Specimens have been collected in rainforest litter, leaf litter under palms, as well as under logs with fungi.
