= Saprosites enarotadii =

Scientific classification
- Kingdom: Animalia
- Phylum: Arthropoda
- Clade: Pancrustacea
- Class: Insecta
- Order: Coleoptera
- Suborder: Polyphaga
- Infraorder: Scarabaeiformia
- Family: Scarabaeidae
- Genus: Saprosites
- Species: S. enarotadii

Binomial name
- Saprosites enarotadii Stebnicka, 1998

Species of beetle

Saprosites enarotadii is a species of beetle of the family Scarabaeidae. It is found in Indonesia (Irian Jaya).

== Description ==
Adults reach a length of about 3–3.2 mm (0.12–0.13 in). They have an elongate, shining black body.
