= Saprosites distans =

Scientific classification
- Kingdom: Animalia
- Phylum: Arthropoda
- Clade: Pancrustacea
- Class: Insecta
- Order: Coleoptera
- Suborder: Polyphaga
- Infraorder: Scarabaeiformia
- Family: Scarabaeidae
- Genus: Saprosites
- Species: S. distans

Binomial name
- Saprosites distans (Sharp, 1876)

Synonyms
- Aphodius distans Sharp, 1876; Aphodius candens Broun, 1880

Species of beetle

Saprosites distans is a species of beetle of the family Scarabaeidae. It is found in New Zealand.

== Description ==
Adults reach a length of about 4.7–5.1 mm (0.19–0.20 in). They have an elongate, slender, moderately shiny, black or reddish black body, with the margins of the pronotum and legs reddish.

== Life history ==
Specimens have been collected near water, where they may be found in rotten logs and under stones.
