= Saprosites mistakensis =

Scientific classification
- Kingdom: Animalia
- Phylum: Arthropoda
- Clade: Pancrustacea
- Class: Insecta
- Order: Coleoptera
- Suborder: Polyphaga
- Infraorder: Scarabaeiformia
- Family: Scarabaeidae
- Genus: Saprosites
- Species: S. mistakensis

Binomial name
- Saprosites mistakensis Stebnicka & Howden, 1996

Species of beetle

Saprosites mistakensis is a species of beetle of the family Scarabaeidae. It is found in Australia (Queensland).

== Description ==
Adults reach a length of about 5.8 mm (0.23 in). They have a robust, shining piceous body.
