= Saprosites implicatus =

Scientific classification
- Kingdom: Animalia
- Phylum: Arthropoda
- Clade: Pancrustacea
- Class: Insecta
- Order: Coleoptera
- Suborder: Polyphaga
- Infraorder: Scarabaeiformia
- Family: Scarabaeidae
- Genus: Saprosites
- Species: S. implicatus

Binomial name
- Saprosites implicatus Schmidt, 1922

Species of beetle

Saprosites implicatus is a species of beetle of the family Scarabaeidae. It is found in Indonesia (Java) and the Philippines (Leyte).

== Description ==
Adults reach a length of about 3.5–4 mm (0.14–0.16 in). They have a parallel-sided, piceous black body, with the ventral surface dark castaneous.
