= Saprosites gestroi =

Scientific classification
- Kingdom: Animalia
- Phylum: Arthropoda
- Clade: Pancrustacea
- Class: Insecta
- Order: Coleoptera
- Suborder: Polyphaga
- Infraorder: Scarabaeiformia
- Family: Scarabaeidae
- Genus: Saprosites
- Species: S. gestroi

Binomial name
- Saprosites gestroi Schmidt, 1910

Species of beetle

Saprosites gestroi is a species of beetle of the family Scarabaeidae. It is found in Equatorial Guinea (Fernando Poo) and the Democratic Republic of the Congo.

== Description ==
Adults reach a length of about 4 mm (0.16 in). They have a shiny, convex, relatively broad, black body. The elytra have a reddish-brown sheen along the sides.
