= Saprosites narae =

Scientific classification
- Kingdom: Animalia
- Phylum: Arthropoda
- Clade: Pancrustacea
- Class: Insecta
- Order: Coleoptera
- Suborder: Polyphaga
- Infraorder: Scarabaeiformia
- Family: Scarabaeidae
- Genus: Saprosites
- Species: S. narae

Binomial name
- Saprosites narae Lewis, 1895

Synonyms
- Saprosites tonkinensis Balthasar, 1933

Species of beetle

Saprosites narae is a species of beetle of the family Scarabaeidae. It is found in Japan (Honshu, Amami-ôshima), India (Assam), Peninsular Malaysia and Vietnam.

== Description ==
Adults reach a length of about 2.8–3.3 mm (0.11–0.13 in). They have a parallel-sided, dark castaneous, moderately shiny body.
