= Saprosites titschacki =

Scientific classification
- Kingdom: Animalia
- Phylum: Arthropoda
- Clade: Pancrustacea
- Class: Insecta
- Order: Coleoptera
- Suborder: Polyphaga
- Infraorder: Scarabaeiformia
- Family: Scarabaeidae
- Genus: Saprosites
- Species: S. titschacki

Binomial name
- Saprosites titschacki Balthasar, 1941

Species of beetle

Saprosites titschacki is a species of beetle of the family Scarabaeidae. It is found in Indonesia (Java, Sumatra) and Malaysia (Peninsular, Sabah).

== Description ==
Adults reach a length of about 4.5–4.8 mm (0.18–0.19 in). They have a brownish-black to black, shiny body.
