= Saprosites dynastoides =

Scientific classification
- Kingdom: Animalia
- Phylum: Arthropoda
- Clade: Pancrustacea
- Class: Insecta
- Order: Coleoptera
- Suborder: Polyphaga
- Infraorder: Scarabaeiformia
- Family: Scarabaeidae
- Genus: Saprosites
- Species: S. dynastoides

Binomial name
- Saprosites dynastoides (Walker, 1858)

Synonyms
- Aphodius dynastoides Walker, 1858; Cylindropterus pleurophoroides Motschulsky, 1863

Species of beetle

Saprosites dynastoides is a species of beetle of the family Scarabaeidae. It is found in Sri Lanka.

== Description ==
Adults reach a length of about 4.5–5.2 mm (0.18–0.20 in). They have a narrow, parallel-sided, convex, dark chestnut-brown or reddish-brown body.
