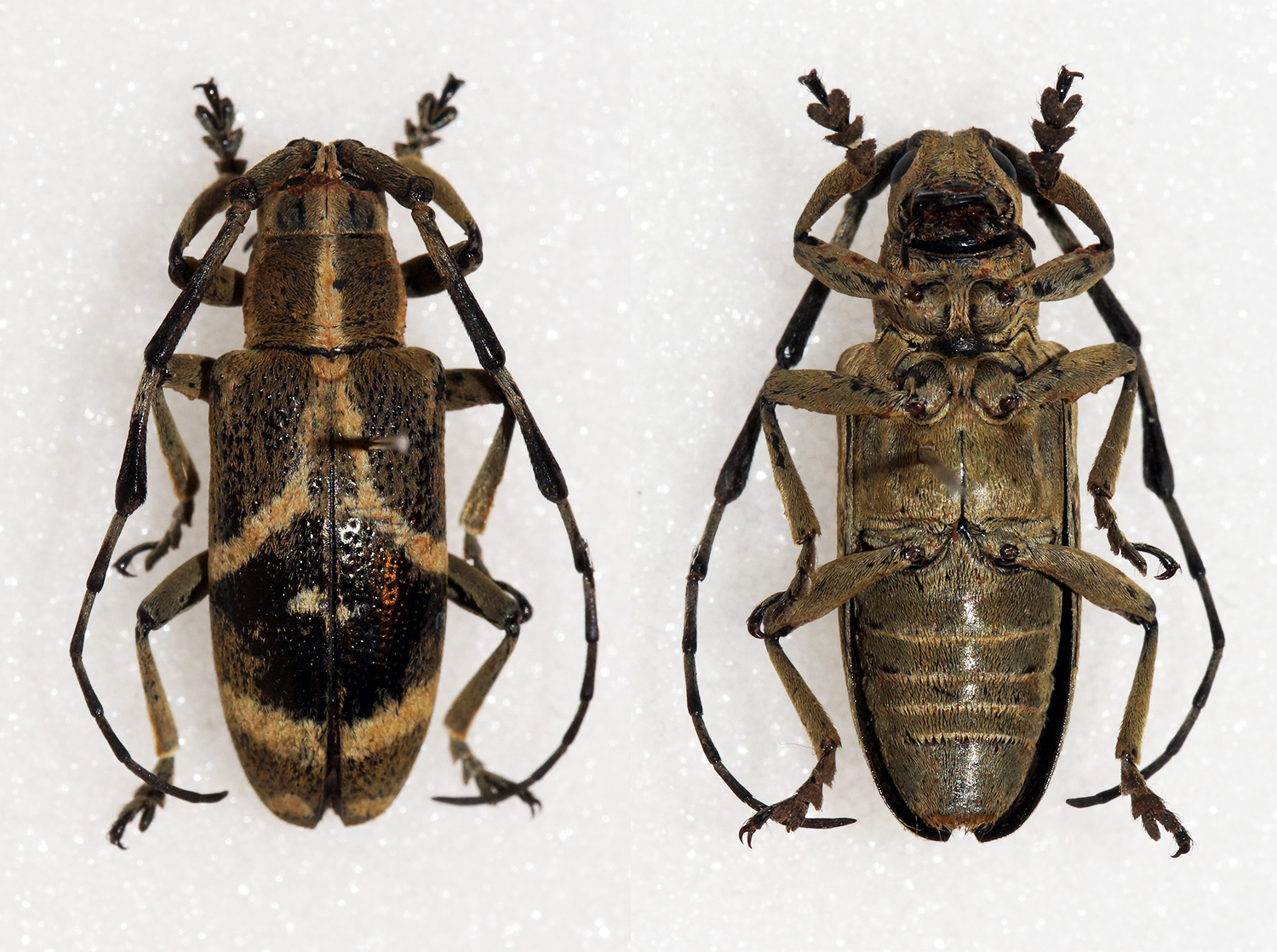

Scientific classification
- Domain: Eukaryota
- Kingdom: Animalia
- Phylum: Arthropoda
- Class: Insecta
- Order: Coleoptera
- Suborder: Polyphaga
- Infraorder: Cucujiformia
- Family: Cerambycidae
- Tribe: Lamiini
- Genus: Marmaroglypha
- Species: M. pubescens

Binomial name
- Marmaroglypha pubescens Aurivillius, 1898

Synonyms
- Agnia pubescens Aurivillius, 1897

= Marmaroglypha pubescens =

Species of beetle

Marmaroglypha pubescens is a species of beetle in the family Cerambycidae. It was described by Per Olof Christopher Aurivillius in 1898 and is known from the Philippines.
