= Saprosites sulcatus =

Scientific classification
- Kingdom: Animalia
- Phylum: Arthropoda
- Clade: Pancrustacea
- Class: Insecta
- Order: Coleoptera
- Suborder: Polyphaga
- Infraorder: Scarabaeiformia
- Family: Scarabaeidae
- Genus: Saprosites
- Species: S. sulcatus

Binomial name
- Saprosites sulcatus Harold, 1869

Synonyms
- Passalaphodius cartwrighti Martinez, 1953

Species of beetle

Saprosites sulcatus is a species of beetle of the family Scarabaeidae. It is found in Argentina, Bolivia, Brazil (Ceará, Distrito Federal, Minas Gerais, Rondônia), Paraguay, Peru and Suriname.

== Description ==
Adults reach a length of about 5–5.5 mm (0.20–0.22 in). The head is punctate and the clypeus is emarginate and finely and densely punctate. The pronotum has minute and coarse punctures. The latter are scattered on the disc, but closer and larger near the lateral margins, especially near the anterior angles. The posterior margin has a marginal line of coarse punctures and the posterior angles are serrate. The elytra have the lateral striae coarsely and closely punctate. They are as wide or wider than the interstriae.

== Life history ==
Specimens were collected under wood bark and rotten logs associated with fungi. This species was found at altitudes ranging from 400 to 1280 metres.
