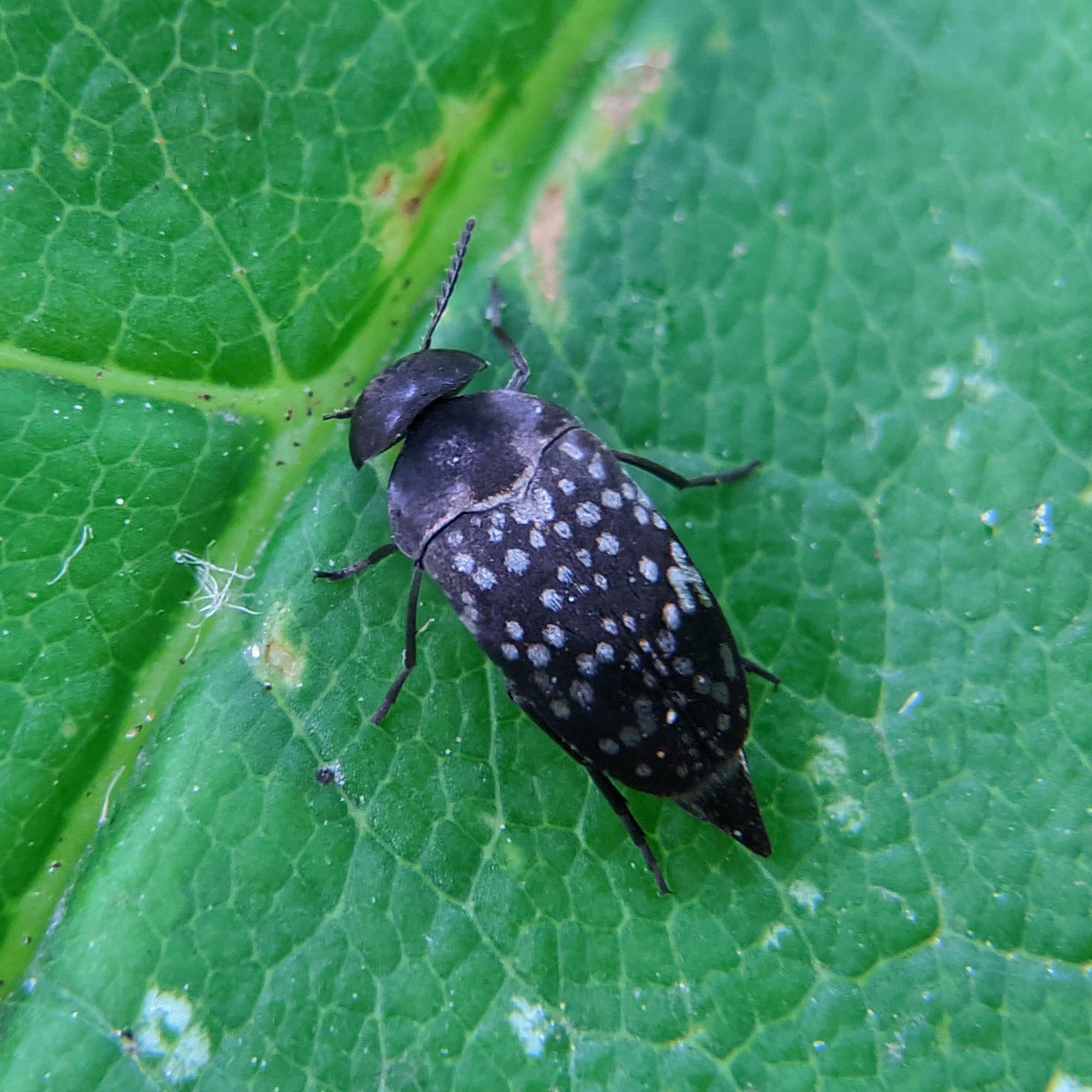
- Curtimorda maculosa, Germany

Scientific classification
- Domain: Eukaryota
- Kingdom: Animalia
- Phylum: Arthropoda
- Class: Insecta
- Order: Coleoptera
- Suborder: Polyphaga
- Infraorder: Cucujiformia
- Family: Mordellidae
- Genus: Curtimorda
- Species: C. maculosa

Binomial name
- Curtimorda maculosa (Naezen, 1794)

Synonyms
- Mordella atomaria Fabricius, 1801; Mordella guttata Paykull, 1798; Mordella guttatipennis Pic, 1927; Mordella irrorata Trost, 1801; Mordella maculosa (Naezen, 1794)

= Curtimorda maculosa =

Species of beetles

Curtimorda maculosa is a species of tumbling flower beetle in the family Mordellidae. It is found in the Palearctic.
