= Saprosites japonicus =

Scientific classification
- Kingdom: Animalia
- Phylum: Arthropoda
- Clade: Pancrustacea
- Class: Insecta
- Order: Coleoptera
- Suborder: Polyphaga
- Infraorder: Scarabaeiformia
- Family: Scarabaeidae
- Genus: Saprosites
- Species: S. japonicus

Binomial name
- Saprosites japonicus Waterhouse, 1875

Synonyms
- Saprosites sumatranus Petrovitz, 1961; Saprosites coomani Paulian, 1933; Saprosites imperfuscus Schmidt, 1922

Species of beetle

Saprosites japonicus is a species of beetle of the family Scarabaeidae. It is found in China (Guangdong, Sichuan, Yunnan), India (Sikkim), Japan (Hokkaido, Honshu, Shikoku, Kyushu, Nakanoshima, Takarajima, Amami-ôshima), Korea, Nepal, Bhutan, the Russian Far East, Taiwan, Indonesia (Sumatra, Bali), Malaysia (Peninsula, Sabah), Thailand and Vietnam.

== Description ==
Adults reach a length of about 4–4.3 mm (0.16–0.17 in). They have a parallel-sided, moderately shining, black body.
