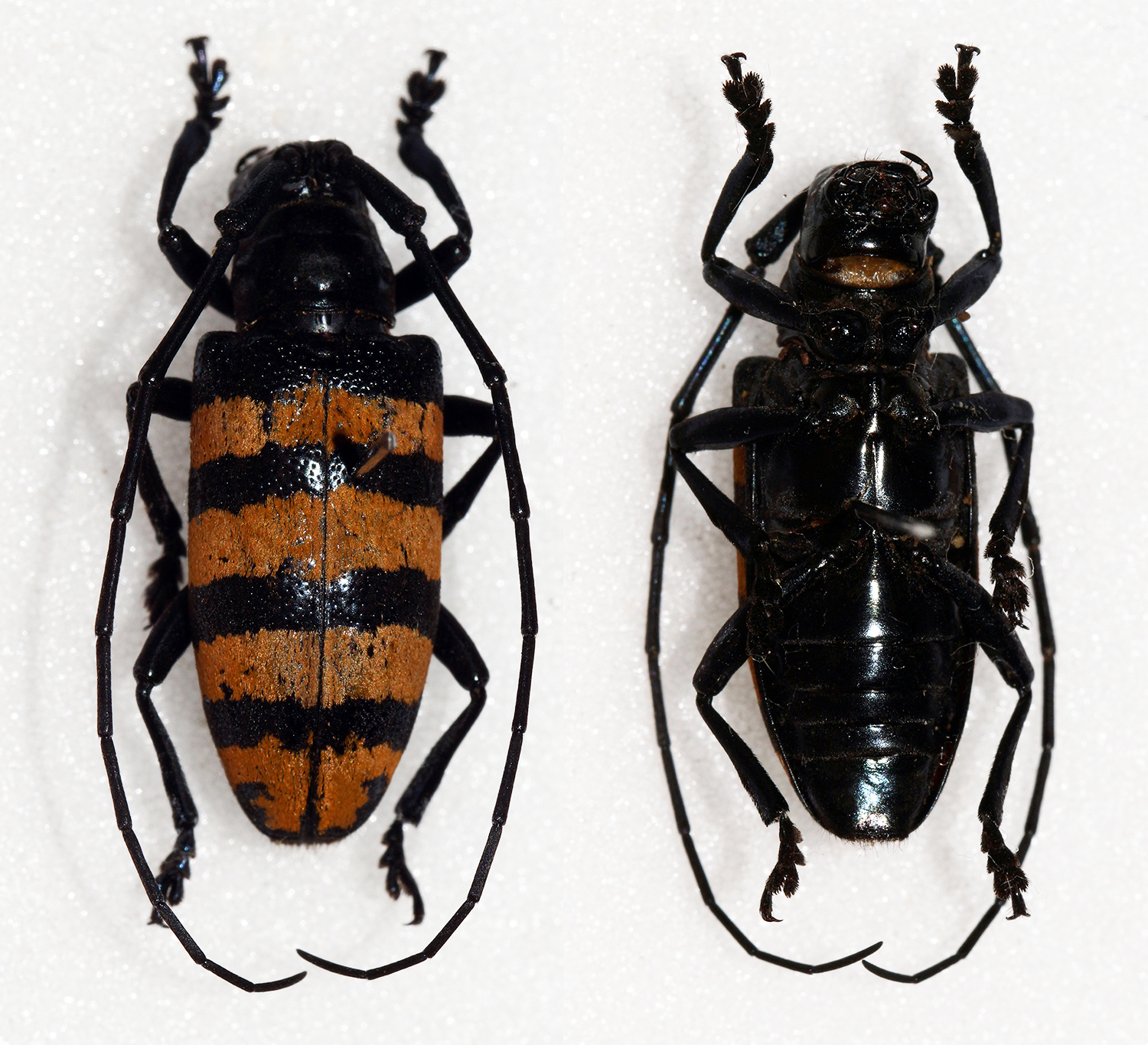

Scientific classification
- Kingdom: Animalia
- Phylum: Arthropoda
- Class: Insecta
- Order: Coleoptera
- Suborder: Polyphaga
- Infraorder: Cucujiformia
- Family: Cerambycidae
- Genus: Agnia
- Species: A. fasciata

Binomial name
- Agnia fasciata Pascoe, 1859

= Agnia fasciata =

Species of beetle

Agnia fasciata is a species of beetle in the family Cerambycidae. It was described by Francis Polkinghorne Pascoe in 1859. It is known from the Moluccas.
