= Saprosites peregrinus =

Scientific classification
- Kingdom: Animalia
- Phylum: Arthropoda
- Clade: Pancrustacea
- Class: Insecta
- Order: Coleoptera
- Suborder: Polyphaga
- Infraorder: Scarabaeiformia
- Family: Scarabaeidae
- Genus: Saprosites
- Species: S. peregrinus

Binomial name
- Saprosites peregrinus Redtenbacher, 1857

Species of beetle

Saprosites peregrinus is a species of beetle of the family Scarabaeidae. It is found in Colombia and Costa Rica.

== Description ==
Adults reach a length of about 2.5–2.8 mm (0.098–0.110 in). They have an elongate, nearly parallel-sided, reddish-brown body, with the legs somewhat lighter brown.
