= Saprosites puncticollis =

Scientific classification
- Kingdom: Animalia
- Phylum: Arthropoda
- Clade: Pancrustacea
- Class: Insecta
- Order: Coleoptera
- Suborder: Polyphaga
- Infraorder: Scarabaeiformia
- Family: Scarabaeidae
- Genus: Saprosites
- Species: S. puncticollis

Binomial name
- Saprosites puncticollis Harold, 1867

Synonyms
- Saprosites sulcifer Schmidt, 1910

Species of beetle

Saprosites puncticollis is a species of beetle of the family Scarabaeidae. It is found in Brazil (Espírito Santo, Minas Gerais, Paraná, Rio de Janeiro, Santa Catarina, São Paulo).

== Description ==
Adults reach a length of about 3.8–4 mm (0.15–0.16 in). The head is punctate, with the punctures on the frons larger than those on the clypeus. The pronotum is coarsely and densely punctate, with the punctures closer and coarser laterally.

== Life history ==
This species has been collected at altitudes up to 1500 metres.
