= Saprosites exsculptus =

Scientific classification
- Kingdom: Animalia
- Phylum: Arthropoda
- Clade: Pancrustacea
- Class: Insecta
- Order: Coleoptera
- Suborder: Polyphaga
- Infraorder: Scarabaeiformia
- Family: Scarabaeidae
- Genus: Saprosites
- Species: S. exsculptus

Binomial name
- Saprosites exsculptus (White, 1846)

Synonyms
- Oxyomus exsculptus White, 1846; Aphodius pascoei Sharp, 1876; Aphodius suspectus Sharp, 1876

Species of beetle

Saprosites exsculptus is a species of beetle of the family Scarabaeidae. It is found in New Zealand.

== Description ==
Adults reach a length of about 5.2–5.5 mm (0.20–0.22 in). They have a robust, elongate, shiny black or rusty brown body. The margins of the pronotum are often reddish.

== Life history ==
Specimens have been collected under stones and bark, as well as in rotten wood.
