= Saprosites porongurupae =

Scientific classification
- Kingdom: Animalia
- Phylum: Arthropoda
- Clade: Pancrustacea
- Class: Insecta
- Order: Coleoptera
- Suborder: Polyphaga
- Infraorder: Scarabaeiformia
- Family: Scarabaeidae
- Genus: Saprosites
- Species: S. porongurupae

Binomial name
- Saprosites porongurupae Stebnicka & Howden, 1996

Species of beetle

Saprosites porongurupae is a species of beetle of the family Scarabaeidae. It is found in Australia (Western Australia).

== Description ==
Adults reach a length of about 3.5–3.6 mm (0.14–0.14 in). They have a dark castaneous to black body, with the margin of the clypeus, anterior angles of the pronotum and legs reddish.
