= Saprosites parallelus =

Scientific classification
- Kingdom: Animalia
- Phylum: Arthropoda
- Clade: Pancrustacea
- Class: Insecta
- Order: Coleoptera
- Suborder: Polyphaga
- Infraorder: Scarabaeiformia
- Family: Scarabaeidae
- Genus: Saprosites
- Species: S. parallelus

Binomial name
- Saprosites parallelus Harold, 1867

Species of beetle

Saprosites parallelus is a species of beetle of the family Scarabaeidae. It is found in Brazil, Colombia, Ecuador, Guatemala, Mexico (Hidalgo), Panama and Peru.

== Description ==
Adults reach a length of about 4.2–4.8 mm (0.17–0.19 in). The head is punctate, with the punctures near the clypeal margin minute, and the punctures at and near the frons slightly larger. The pronotum has fine and coarse punctures, the latter more scattered, and closer near the lateral margins. The discal interstriae on the elytra have punctures as coarse as the lateral ones. The abdominal ventrites have minute scattered punctures.

== Life history ==
This species has been collected inside dead trees at altitudes ranging from 810 to 3000 metres.
