= Saprosites pygmaeus =

Scientific classification
- Kingdom: Animalia
- Phylum: Arthropoda
- Clade: Pancrustacea
- Class: Insecta
- Order: Coleoptera
- Suborder: Polyphaga
- Infraorder: Scarabaeiformia
- Family: Scarabaeidae
- Genus: Saprosites
- Species: S. pygmaeus

Binomial name
- Saprosites pygmaeus Harold, 1877

Synonyms
- Saprosites gomyi Paulian, 1978

Species of beetle

Saprosites pygmaeus is a species of beetle of the family Scarabaeidae. It is found in Australia (Queensland, Christmas Island), Papua New Guinea, Indonesia (Irian Jaya), the Philippines, the Seychelles, Madagascar, the Mascarenes, the Comoros, Tahiti, Hawaii, Fiji, Vanuatu, the Caroline Islands, the Mariana Islands, the Key Islands, the Solomons Islands and Kure.

== Description ==
Adults reach a length of about 2–2.3 mm (0.079–0.091 in). They have a parallel-sided, reddish brown or yellowish brown, shining body.

== Life history ==
Specimens have been collected under the bark of breadfruit trees, in soil and under dead bark of Hibiscus tiliaceus.
