= Agnia lucipor =

Scientific classification
- Kingdom: Animalia
- Phylum: Arthropoda
- Class: Insecta
- Order: Coleoptera
- Suborder: Polyphaga
- Infraorder: Cucujiformia
- Family: Cerambycidae
- Genus: Agnia
- Species: A. lucipor

Binomial name
- Agnia lucipor Breuning, 1982

Species of beetle

Agnia lucipor is a species of beetle in the family Cerambycidae. It was described by Stephan von Breuning in 1982. It is known from the Philippines.
