= Saprosites sulcatissimus =

Scientific classification
- Kingdom: Animalia
- Phylum: Arthropoda
- Clade: Pancrustacea
- Class: Insecta
- Order: Coleoptera
- Suborder: Polyphaga
- Infraorder: Scarabaeiformia
- Family: Scarabaeidae
- Genus: Saprosites
- Species: S. sulcatissimus

Binomial name
- Saprosites sulcatissimus (Broun, 1911)

Synonyms
- Aphodius sulcatissimus Broun, 1911

Species of beetle

Saprosites sulcatissimus is a species of beetle of the family Scarabaeidae. It is found in New Zealand.

== Description ==
Adults reach a length of about 3.5–3.8 mm (0.14–0.15 in). They have a elongate-oval, shiny, carbon black to black body, with the legs reddish, and sometimes with the elytra somewhat lighter than the head and pronotum.

== Life history ==
Specimens have been collected in leaf litter and sand.
