= Saprosites difficilis =

Scientific classification
- Kingdom: Animalia
- Phylum: Arthropoda
- Clade: Pancrustacea
- Class: Insecta
- Order: Coleoptera
- Suborder: Polyphaga
- Infraorder: Scarabaeiformia
- Family: Scarabaeidae
- Genus: Saprosites
- Species: S. difficilis

Binomial name
- Saprosites difficilis Harold, 1877

Species of beetle

Saprosites difficilis is a species of beetle of the family Scarabaeidae. It is found in Brunei, Indonesia (Java, Sulawesi) and Malaysia (Sabah).

== Description ==
Adults reach a length of about 4.5–5 mm (0.18–0.20 in). They have a parallel-sided, shining black body.
