= Saprosites longethorax =

Scientific classification
- Kingdom: Animalia
- Phylum: Arthropoda
- Clade: Pancrustacea
- Class: Insecta
- Order: Coleoptera
- Suborder: Polyphaga
- Infraorder: Scarabaeiformia
- Family: Scarabaeidae
- Genus: Saprosites
- Species: S. longethorax

Binomial name
- Saprosites longethorax Paulian, 1944

Species of beetle

Saprosites longethorax is a species of beetle of the family Scarabaeidae. It is found in the Philippines (Luzon) and Taiwan.

== Description ==
Adults reach a length of about 2–2.5 mm (0.079–0.098 in). They have an elongate, parallel-sided, slightly convex, glossy, blackish-brown body.
