= Marmaroglypha =

Scientific classification
- Domain: Eukaryota
- Kingdom: Animalia
- Phylum: Arthropoda
- Class: Insecta
- Order: Coleoptera
- Suborder: Polyphaga
- Infraorder: Cucujiformia
- Family: Cerambycidae
- Tribe: Lamiini
- Genus: Marmaroglypha

Genus of beetles

Marmaroglypha is a genus of longhorn beetles of the subfamily Lamiinae, containing the following species:

- Marmaroglypha densepunctata Breuning, 1948
- Marmaroglypha fasciata (Pascoe, 1869)
- Marmaroglypha nicobarica Redtenbacher, 1868
- Marmaroglypha sumatrana Ritsema, 1888
- Marmaroglypha vermiculata Breuning, 1948
