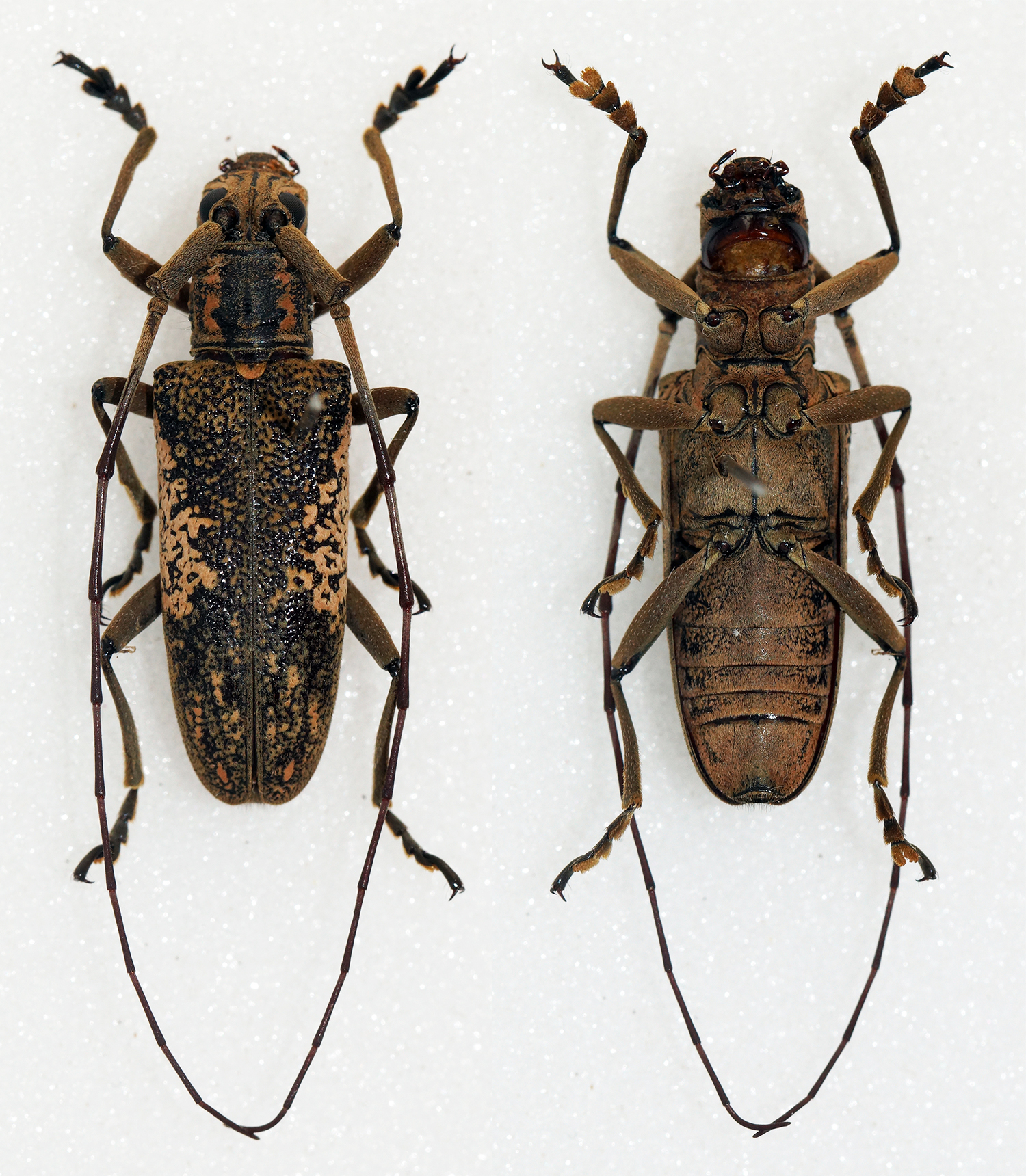

Scientific classification
- Kingdom: Animalia
- Phylum: Arthropoda
- Class: Insecta
- Order: Coleoptera
- Suborder: Polyphaga
- Infraorder: Cucujiformia
- Family: Cerambycidae
- Genus: Euthyastus
- Species: E. binotatus

Binomial name
- Euthyastus binotatus Pascoe, 1866

= Euthyastus =

Genus of beetles

Euthyastus binotatus is a species of beetle in the family Cerambycidae, and the only species in the genus Euthyastus. It was described by Pascoe in 1866.
