= Ludwig Redtenbacher =

Austrian medical doctor and entomologist

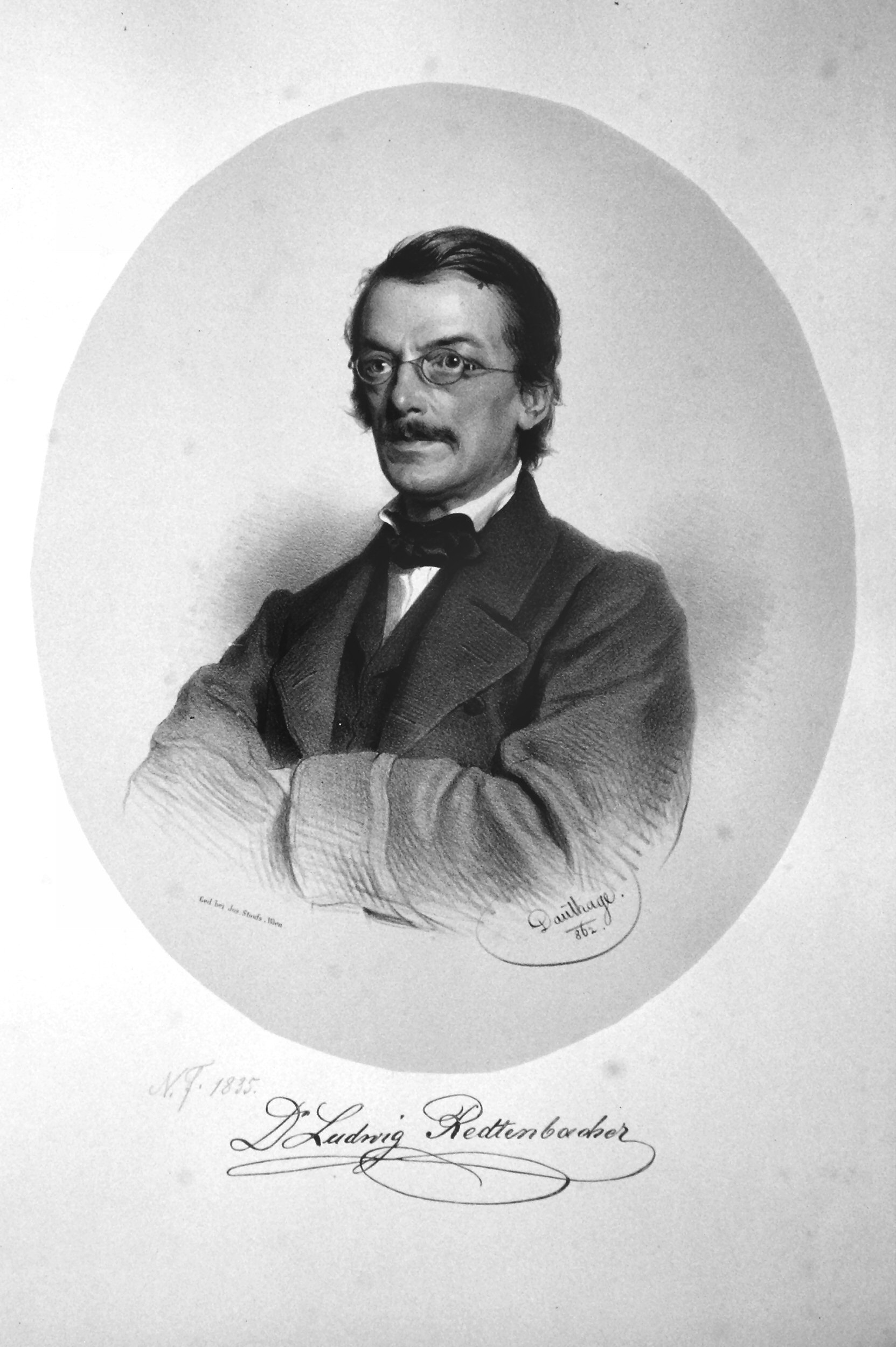
Ludwig Redtenbacher

Ludwig Redtenbacher (10 June 1814 – 8 February 1876) was an Austrian medical doctor and entomologist mainly interested in beetles.

== Life ==
Ludwig Redtenbacher was born on 10 June 1814 in Kirchdorf an der Krems, Austrian Empire. He was the brother of the chemist Josef Redtenbacher (1810–1870).

From 1833 to 1838, Ludwig Redtenbacher studied medicine at the University of Vienna, becoming a salaried trainee in 1840. In 1843, he earned his medical doctorate, afterwards working as an assistant with the entomological collection of the Hofnaturalienkabinett (from 1847). In 1851, he became a professor of zoology in Prague and, from 1860, he was director of the Vienna Natural History Museum.

Although Redtenbacher worked mainly on the beetles of Austria, his new approach to classification or, in German, "analytischen" was widely adopted. He is also significant for his work involving beetles collected on the voyage of the Novara, an Austrian frigate that went on a round-the-world scientific expedition between 1857 and 1859.

He also described many of the beetles collected by Ida Pfeiffer (1797-1858). He wrote the entomological portion of Joseph Russegger's Reisen in Europa, Asien und Afrika (Travels in Europe, Asia and Africa).

Redtenbacher died on 8 February 1876 in Vienna.

== Honours ==
In 1848, Carl Eduard Hammerschmidt named comadia redtenbacheri, known as the caterpillar placed in bottles of mezcal, in honour of Ludwig Redtenbacher.

The Redtenbachergasse in the Viennese districts of Ottakring and Hernals was named in his honor in 1894.

== Literary works ==
His most significant works were:

- Die Gattungen der deutschen Käfer-Fauna nach der analytischen Methode, 1845 - Genera of German beetle fauna via the "analytical method".
- Reise der österreichischen Fregatte Novara um die Erde in den Jahren 1857, 1858,1859 unter den befehlen des Commodore B. von Wüllerstorf-Urbair. Zoologischer Theil. Zweiter Band: Coleopteren. 249 pp., illus. (1868)
- Fauna Austriaca. Die Käfer, nach der analytischen Methode bearbeitet. Wien : Karl Gerold 1st Edn. xxvii 883 pp. (1849). Second expanded and revised edition 1858, third edition 1874.

== Insects described by Ludwig Redtenbacher ==
- Mesoprionus persicus, described in 1850
- Nagiella quadrimaculalis (Kollar & Redtenbacher, 1844)
