= Isabel Coss =

Mexican pastry chef

- Born: Mexico City, Mexico
- Culinary career
- Current restaurant(s): Lutèce, Pascual
- Awards won: Rammy Award (2026); James Beard Award Best Chef (Mid-Atlantic) Semifinalist (2025); Food and Wine Best New Chef (2023); StarChefs Rising Pastry Chef (2019

Isabel Coss is a Mexican pastry chef best known for her work as head pastry chef at Lutèce and co-founder and pastry chef at Pascual. Her work focuses on Mexican pastries and desserts. She was named a Best New Chef by Food and Wine in 2023, and was a semifinalist for a James Beard award.

== Biography ==
Coss was born and raised in Mexico City. She first wanted to be a film director, and trained in ballet. However, she ultimately decided to become a chef, beginning as a bread maker at Pujol, and in 2011, moved to New York. Her goal was to attend the Culinary Institute of America, but due to price, she decided to gain hands-on experience instead. She worked as a pastry chef at Empellon, where she met her husband, and also worked at Agern.

After receiving a job offer from a friend at a New Year's party, she worked as a pastry chef under Daniela Soto-Innes, a fellow former Pujol employee, at Cosme. During this time, Soto-Innes was named World's Best Female Chef, and Coss was seen as a key member of the team behind her. She was named a Rising Pastry Chef by StarChefs in 2019.

In December 2020, she left Cosme to join her husband, Matt Conroy, a fellow chef, at Lutèce. At the start, the restaurant was understaffed and Coss found herself doing many different jobs, but by 2022, the work had evened out and Coss began dedicating herself to Mexican pastries. In 2023, she was named a Best New Chef by Food & Wine.

In February 2024, while staying at Lutèce, she opened a Mexican restaurant, Pascual, together with her husband, which "pays homage to the buzz of life in Mexico City". One of the most popular dishes there utilizes huitlacoche as a reference to her grandfather, who farmed corn and enjoyed huitlacoche. Much of the food is cooked in a hearth oven, and the menu changes seasonally. The restaurant received a positive review from The Washington Post and was named 42nd Best Restaurant in North America by The World's 50 Best Restaurants.

She also opened daytime coffee and pastry shop Volcan inside the same location as Pascual. She stepped down as head pastry chef at Lutèce in 2025 to focus on Pascual. In 2025, she was named to the James Beard Foundation Taste America series. In 2026, her husband and her were co-awarded a Rammy Award for Chef of the Year.

She has also studied how to make ice cream, taking a class at Penn State.

Food & Wine described her desserts as food with a "playful outlook" where "nothing is quite what it seems", for example white chocolate fig leaf Canelé and sorbet surrounded with gelatin cubes. Her signature is a honeycomb semifreddo. Another notable dish she's made is a savory mille-feuille made from mole, plantain, sweet cream, and caviar.
