= Cosme (restaurant) =

Restaurant in New York City

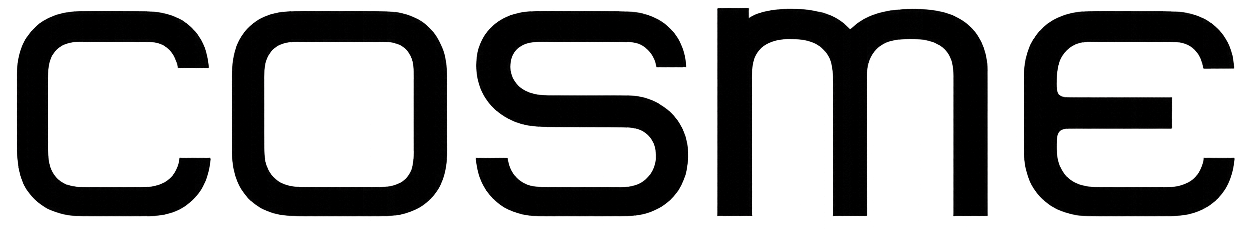

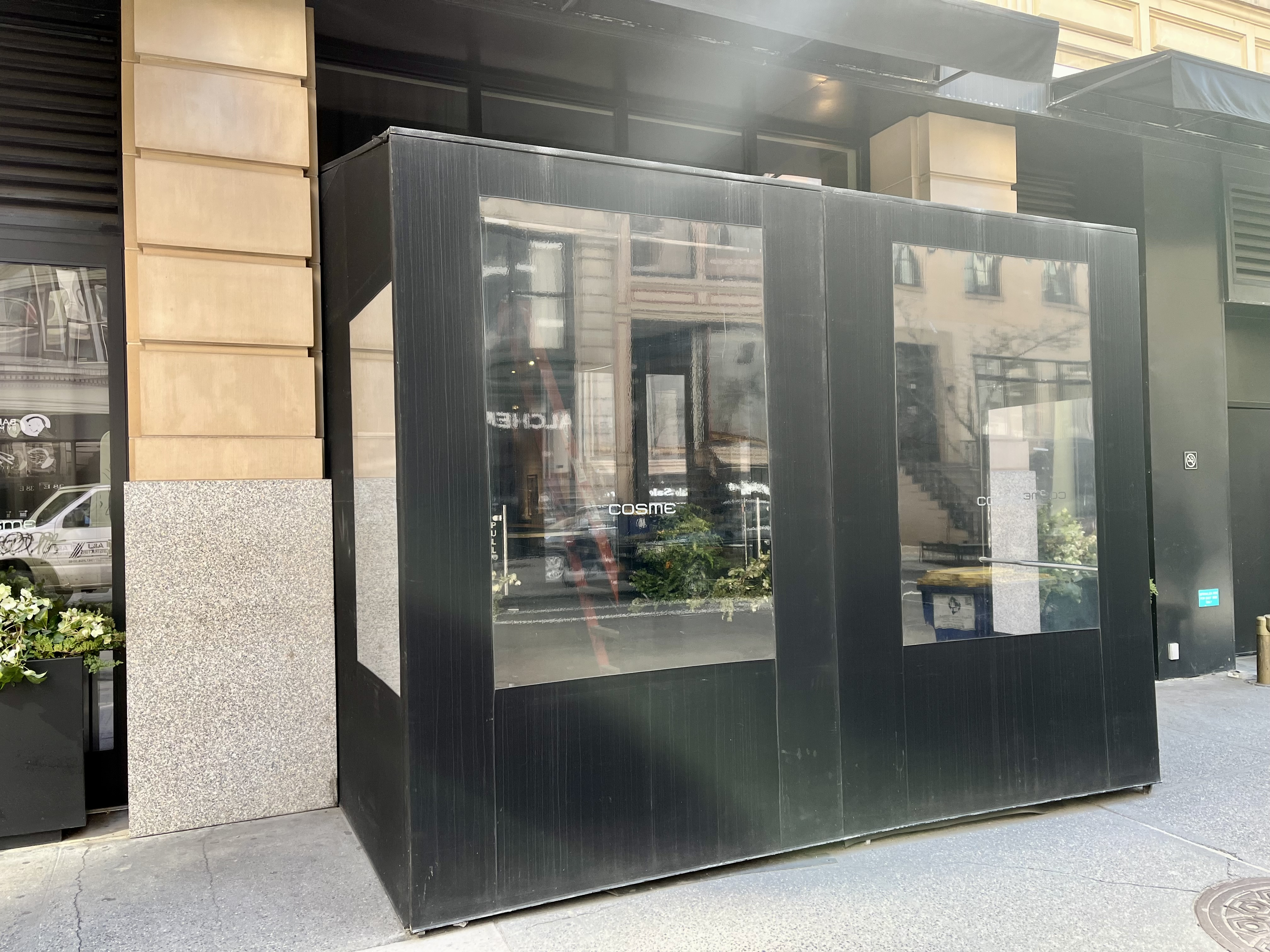
- The restaurant's exterior in 2026
- Interactive map of Cosme

Restaurant information
- Established: October 21, 2014; 12 years ago
- Owner: Enrique Olvera
- Food type: Mexican
- Location: 35 E 21st St, New York City, United States
- Coordinates: 40°44′22″N 73°59′18″W
- Reservations: Recommended
- Website: cosmenyc.com

Cosme is a Mexican restaurant in the Flatiron District of Manhattan in New York City, United States. It is owned by the Mexican chef Enrique Olvera. It ranked 22nd on the World's 50 Best Restaurants list in 2021.

== Description ==
Cosme serves Mexican food. A tostada with uni is the signature dish.

== History ==
Chef Enrique Olvera, owner of Pujol, a restaurant in Mexico City, opened Cosme on 21 October 2014 in Flatiron District, New York City, while splitting his time between the two cities. He opened it with the aim of creating an elegant yet casual restaurant serving Mexican cuisine made with local ingredients. He opened it with three other associates.

As of its opening, it operated with around 60 people, most of whom were of Latino origin. Chefs and employees have included Gustavo Garnica, Isabel Coss, and Daniela Soto-Innes.

The owners acquired a former strip club, and removed its floor and poles. It was remodeled within nine months. The décor became contemporary, adding a 5-meter (16 ft) bar with high chairs. The restaurant features a minimalist interior in white and gray tones, with shelves decorated with books, bottles, and glassware. Its furnishings include black chairs and light wood tables set over gray concrete floors. The lighting is dim, and each table is lit by an individual black lamp.

The restaurant was named Cosme after the Mercado de San Cosme, a public market in Mexico City; he also associated the word with cosmos, which, for him, is represented by New York City.

In 2019, Olvera faced a class-action lawsuit from former employees alleging wage theft and tip misappopriation. For its tenth anniversary, La Sonora Dinamita performed live at the restaurant.

== Reception ==
Pete Wells of the New York Times gave Cosme three out of four stars. He praised the restaurant for its ambience and described the food as "thrill[ing]", comparing it to restaurants like Estela, whose seafood- and vegetable-based dishes resemble salads in their approach. Wells was critical of the dessert options, saying they were inferior to the rest of the menu. The Michelin Guide praised its atmosphere and décor.

William Reed Ltd. has ranked Cosme on its World's 50 Best Restaurants lists multiple times: at number 22 (2021), 23 (2019), 25 (2018), 40 (2017), 69 (2022), 73 (2023), and 99 (2024).
