= Ataenius holopubescens =

Scientific classification
- Kingdom: Animalia
- Phylum: Arthropoda
- Clade: Pancrustacea
- Class: Insecta
- Order: Coleoptera
- Suborder: Polyphaga
- Infraorder: Scarabaeiformia
- Family: Scarabaeidae
- Genus: Ataenius
- Species: A. holopubescens

Binomial name
- Ataenius holopubescens Hinton, 1938

Species of beetle

Ataenius holopubescens is a species of beetle of the family Scarabaeidae. It is found in Guatemala, Honduras and Mexico (Chiapas, Guerrero, Jalisco, México, Morelos, Puebla, San Luis Potosí, Veracruz).

== Description ==
Adults reach a length of about 3.5–3.8 mm (0.14–0.15 in). They have a dark castaneous or reddish brown body, partially covered with a coating.

== Life history ==
Specimens have been collected in detritus remnants near and in nests of Atta mexicana.
