= Chicatana sauce =

Mexican hot sauce

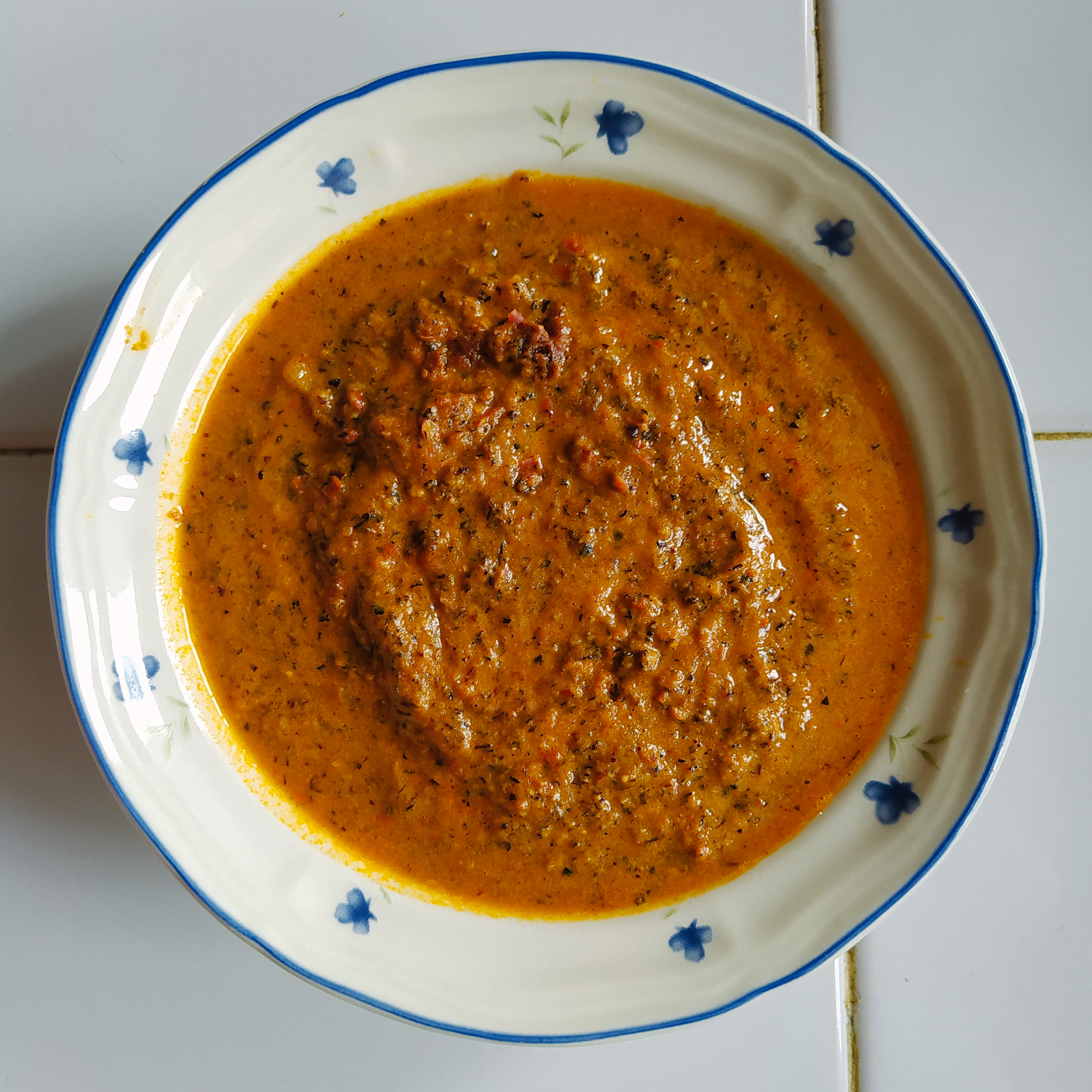
- Alternative names: salsa chicatana, salsa de nukús
- Type: hot sauce
- Place of origin: Mexico
- Region or state: South Mexico
- Main ingredients: Chicatana ants · chilli · onion · garlic · salt

Chicatana ants sauce is a Mexican hot sauce of Mixtec origin, composed mainly of chicatana ants (Atta mexicana) and some dry chili such as costeño or árbol. It also usually contains garlic, onion, tomato, salt and oil, and is traditionally ground in a metate or molcajete.

It is served to accompany tamales, tacos, mole or meats. It is popular to enjoy it in a tortilla with costeño cheese. It is considered a delicacy in the cuisines of Chiapas, Oaxaca, Puebla and Veracruz.

== Preparation ==
Just collected, the ants are drowned in water to die, and are roasted on a comal until golden brown. When they harden, their wings are removed. It is important to remove its wings because they do not grind well. On the same comal, the chilies, garlics and onions are roasted. Some recipes do not roast the garlic and onion, and use them raw.

Finally, everything is crushed in a molcajete or metate, or failing that, a blender, although beforehand, the chiles must be rehydrated in a container with water for a few minutes, or otherwise it would be very difficult to crush them. The chili seeds are left or removed according to the diner's taste, if they want it spicy or not. Once crushed, it is corrected for salt and served.

== Description ==
It is a sauce that is part of the indigenous culinary tradition of Mexico, this means, not only that it probably has a pre-Hispanic origin, but also that it maintains the old traditional processes of: harvesting the chicatana ant during the start from the rainy season (May-July), use of traditional utensils such as the clay comal or the metate, and local production, mainly for self-consumption (it is rarely for sale in shops). The Florentine Codex (1585) speaks of tzicatanas as common food.

== Gallery ==
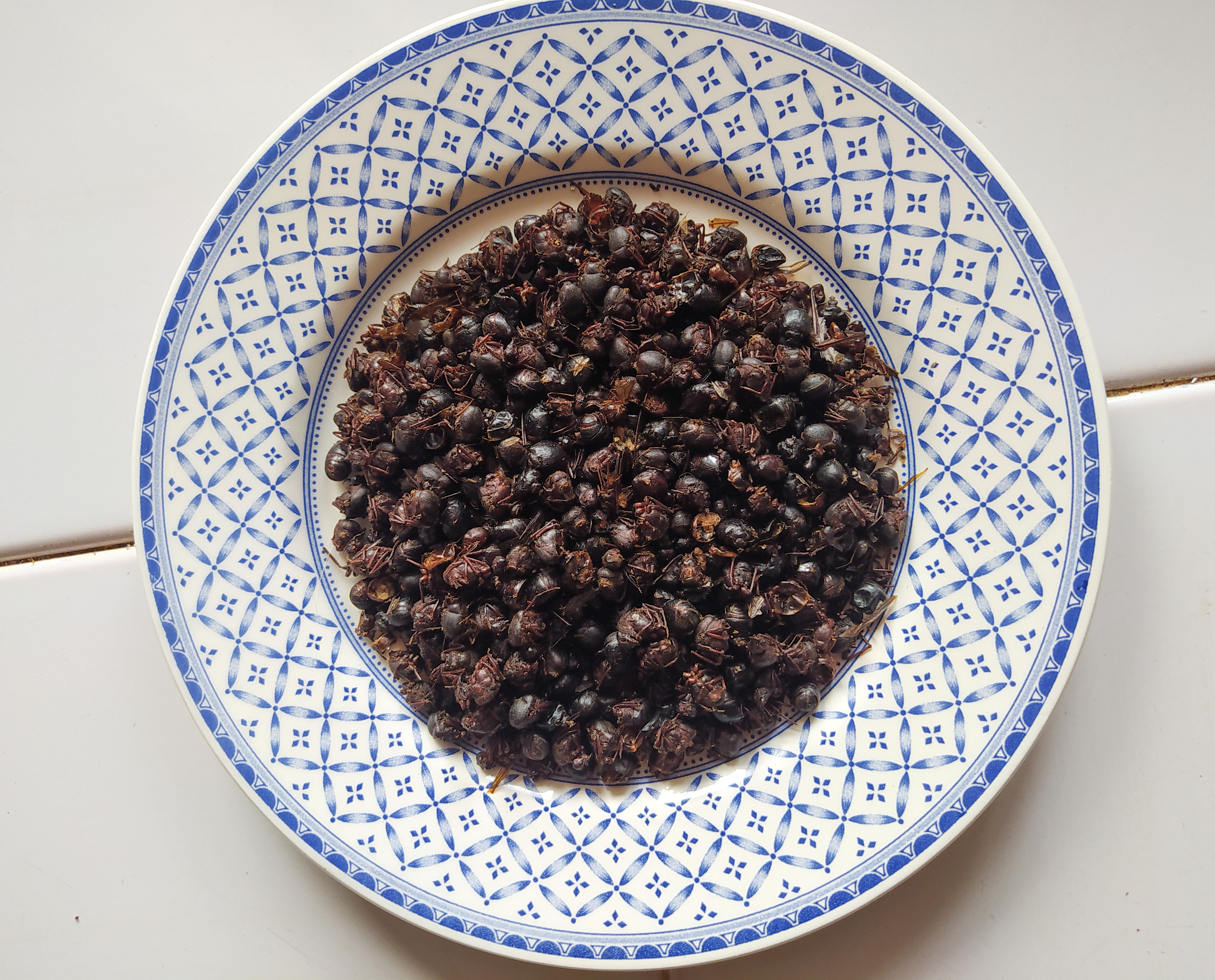
already roasted chicatana ants

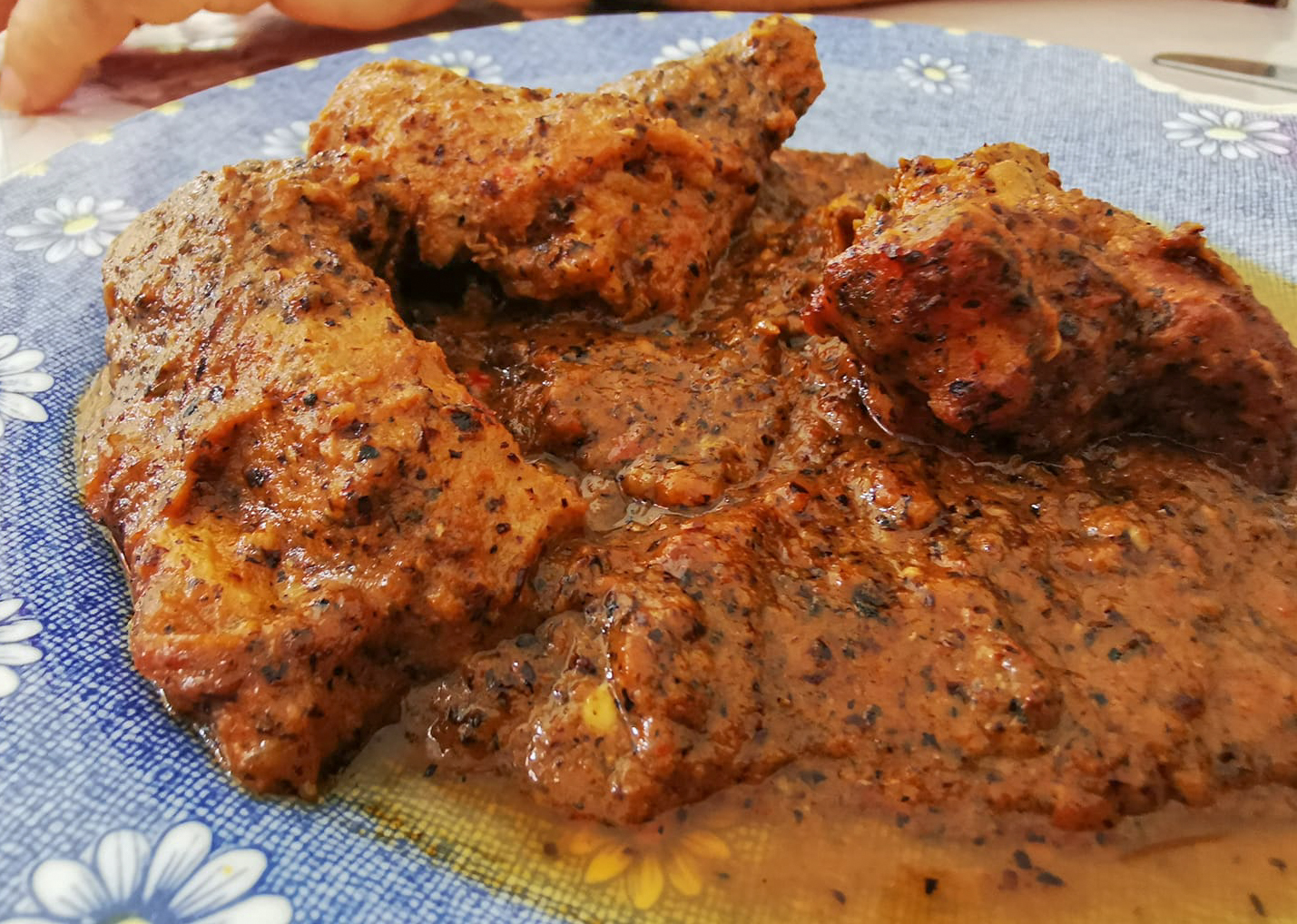
Chicken with chicatana sauce

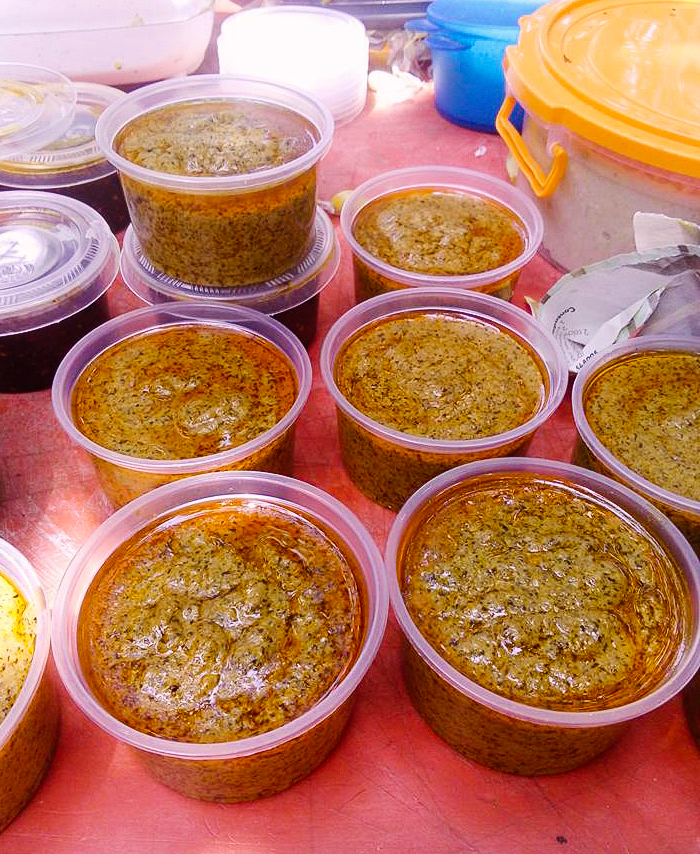
Chicatana ant sauce for sale at a street stall.

== See also ==
- Mexican sauces
