= Pujol (restaurant) =

Mexican restaurant in Mexico City, Mexico

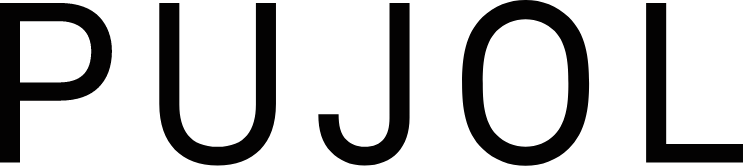

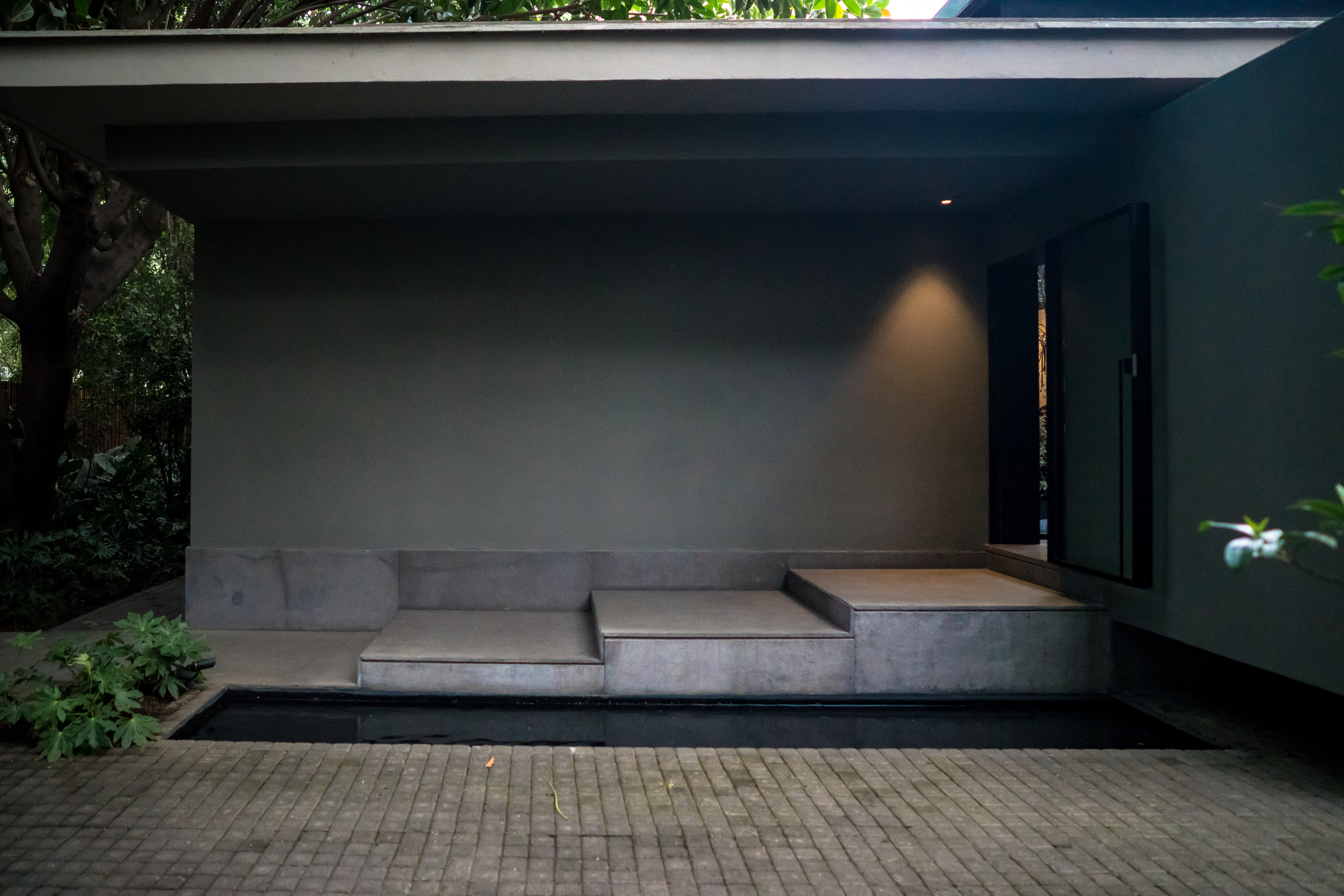
- The restaurant's entrance in 2018
- Interactive map of Pujol

Restaurant information
- Established: 6 May 2000; 26 years ago
- Owner: Enrique Olvera
- Head chef: Enrique Olvera
- Food type: Mexican cuisine; molecular gastronomy
- Dress code: None
- Rating: (Michelin Guide, 2024)
- Location: Tennyson 133, Polanco IV Sección, Miguel Hidalgo, Mexico City, 11550, Mexico
- Coordinates: 19°25′56.6″N 99°11′41.4″W
- Reservations: Yes
- Website: pujol.com.mx/eng/

Pujol ([puˈʒɔl]) is a Mexican restaurant in Polanco, Miguel Hidalgo, Mexico City. It is owned and headed by chef Enrique Olvera. Pujol's dishes are rooted in traditional Mexican cuisine, including maize-based food, seafood, and tacos, served in a sophisticated presentation through tasting menus or a taco omakase bar.

Founded in 2000, Pujol initially focused on Asian and American cuisine with only a few Mexican elements. After facing financial difficulties, the restaurant shifted its focus to traditional Mexican fare. The British company William Reed Ltd has consistently ranked Pujol on its list of the World's 50 Best Restaurants since the 2010s. Food critics have given the restaurant mostly favorable reviews; its most iconic dish is mole madre, mole nuevo—a black mole sauce that, by 2022, had been reheated over 2,800 times, with fresh moles regularly added to develop its evolving flavor. The restaurant has also faced complaints regarding workplace harassment.

Pujol was awarded two Michelin stars in 2024, in the first Michelin Guide covering restaurants in Mexico, tying with Quintonil—also located in Polanco—for the highest rating in the country.

== Description ==
Pujol offers two constantly updated tasting menu options: one focused on maize-based dishes and the other on seafood. Additionally, the restaurant has a taco omakase bar, where chefs choose the courses for the diner. The tasting menu consists of seven dishes served at regular tables, while the omakase experience offers a nine- to ten-course meal that changes daily and is served at the bar. There are no à la carte options, and beverages are sold separately.

For groups, table reservations are scheduled to last between two and a half to three hours; if additional time is required, guests may continue their meal on the terrace. There is no formal dress code and reservations are required; the restaurant recommends booking five to seven weeks in advance.

The oldest plate on Pujol's menu is the appetizer: baby corn cobs served inside a gourd and dipped in chicatana sauce, a blend of coffee mayonnaise, costeño chili, and chicatana ants. The restaurant's most iconic dish is mole madre, mole nuevo, a mole sauce prepared with more than 100 ingredients—including tomatoes, dried fruits, fruits, and cocoa—which, as of 23 July 2022, had been aged for 2,852 days. It is plated in a circular presentation with a layer of fresh mole sauce poured over the aged mole. Other offerings served include tlayudas, lobsters, fish, aguachile, and puchero. The restaurant also incorporates techniques from molecular gastronomy into some of its preparations.

=== Gallery ===
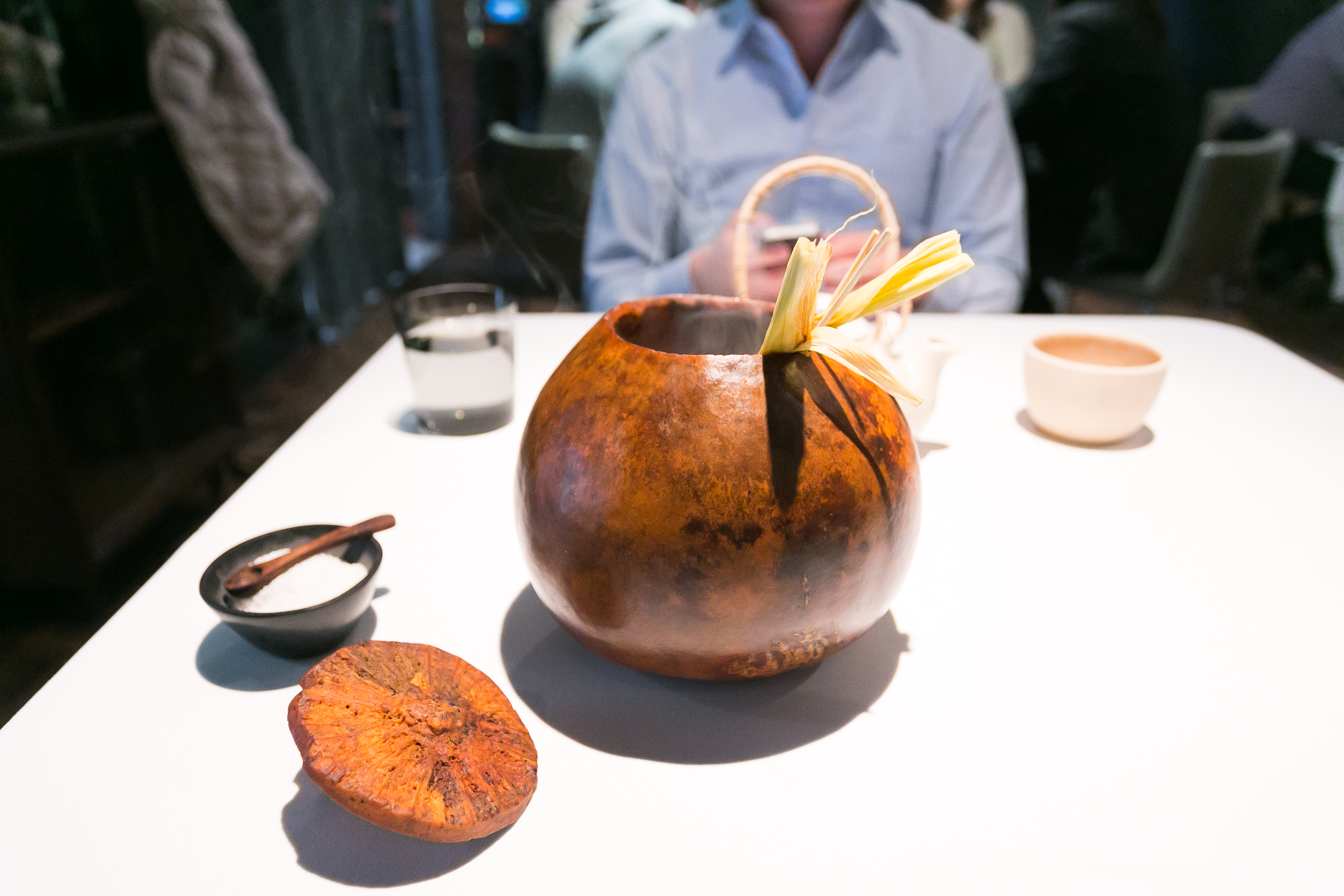
Baby corn with coffee mayonnaise, costeño chili and chicatana ants

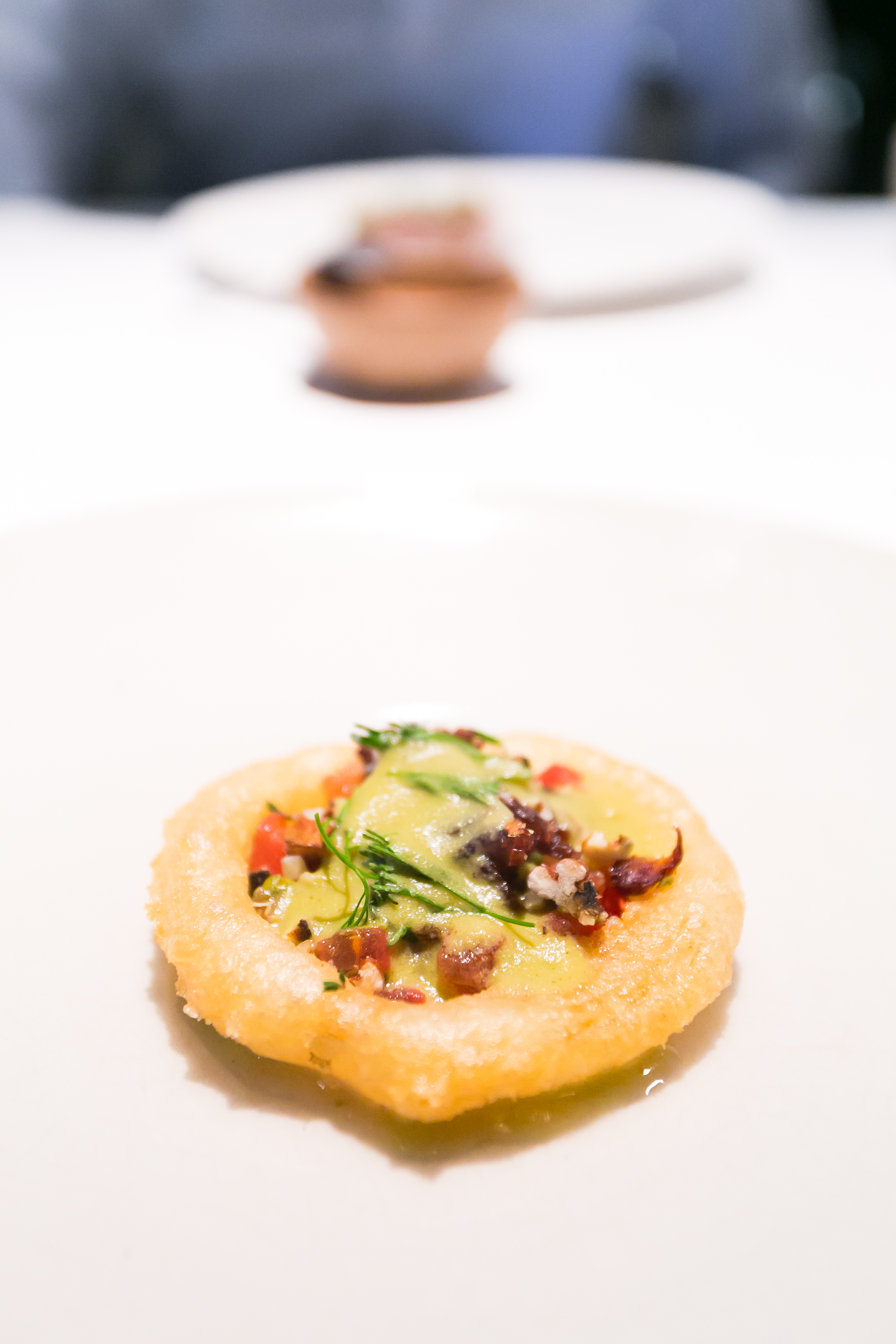
Onion ring with capers

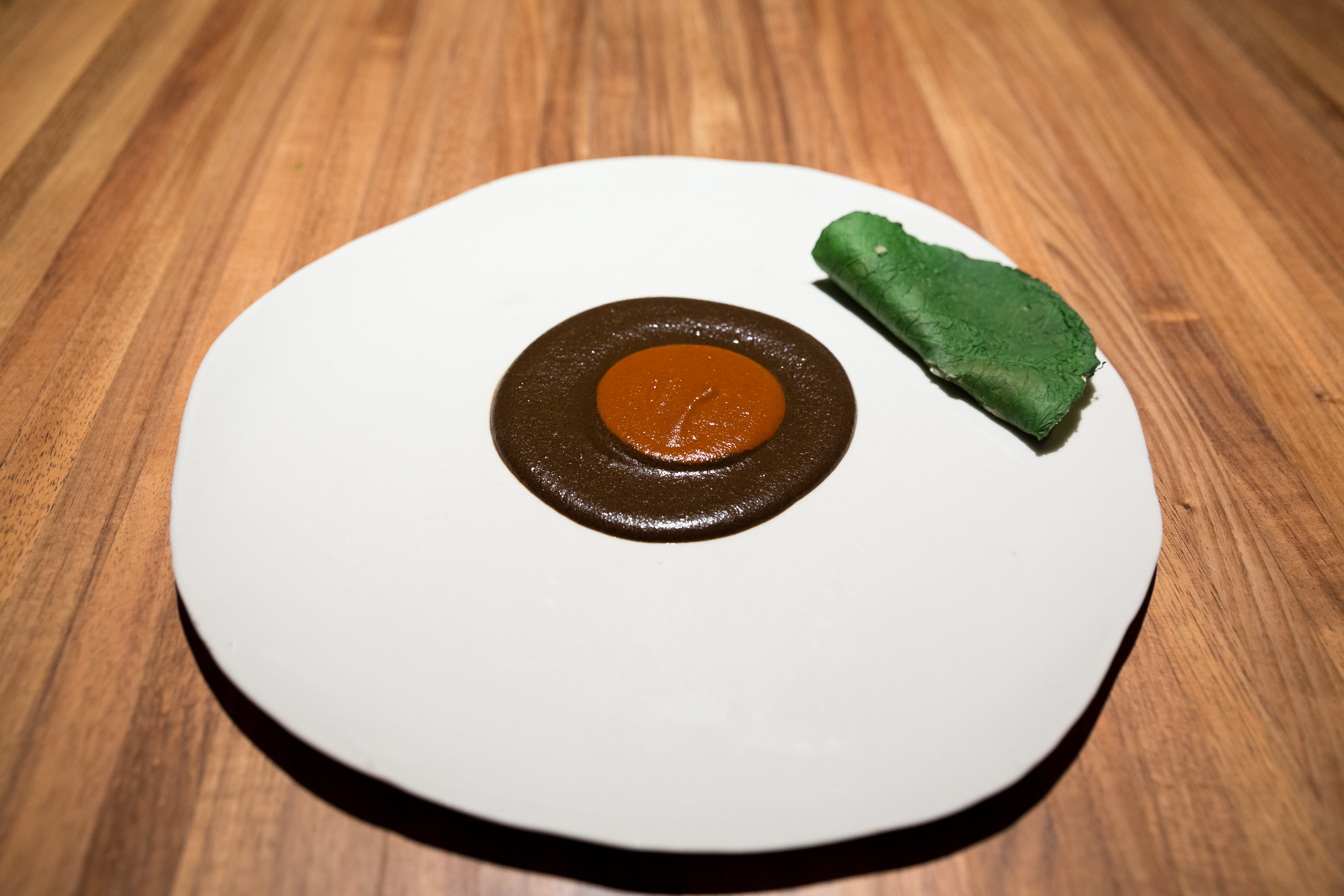
Mole madre, mole nuevo

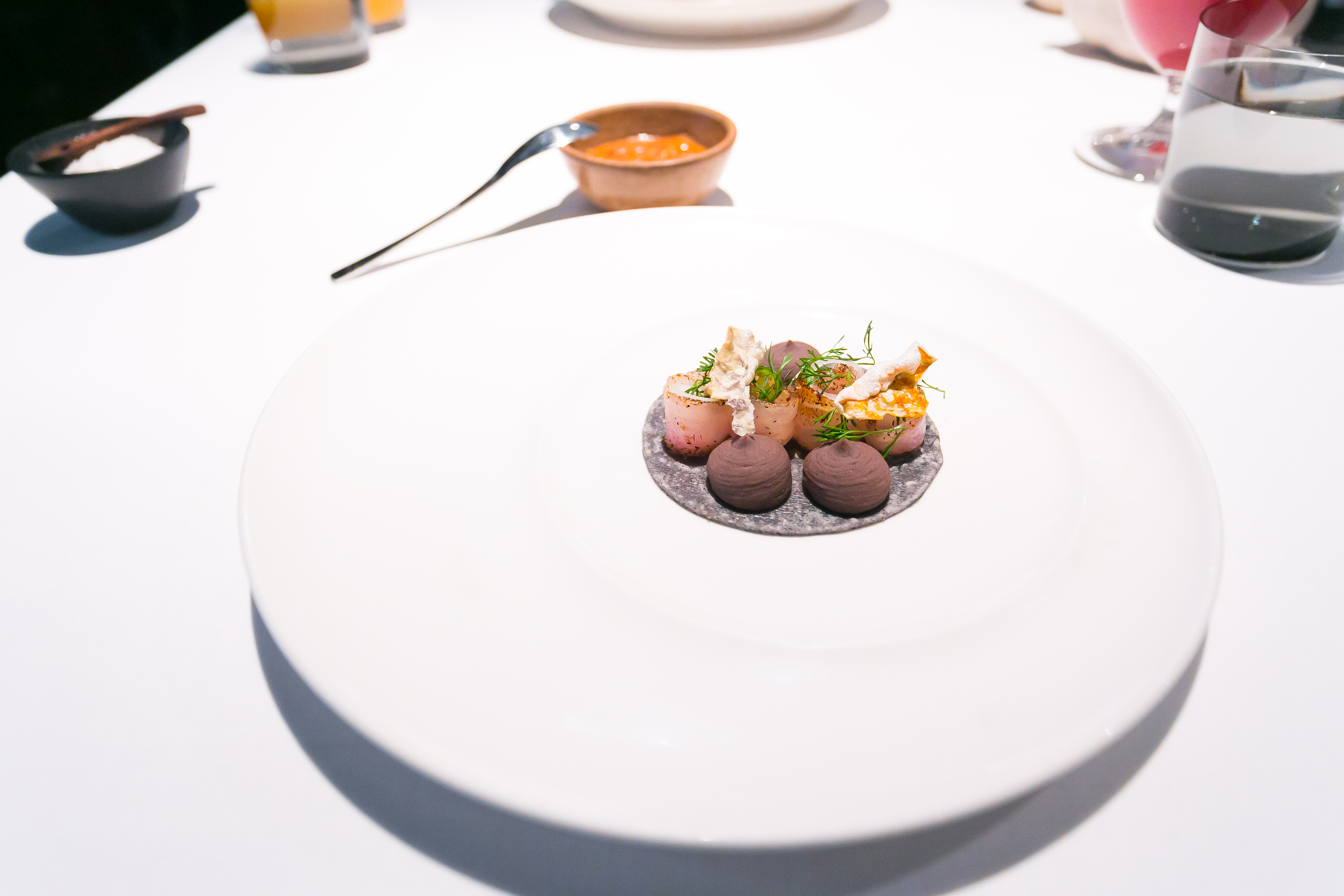
Ceviche, beans and hoja santa taco

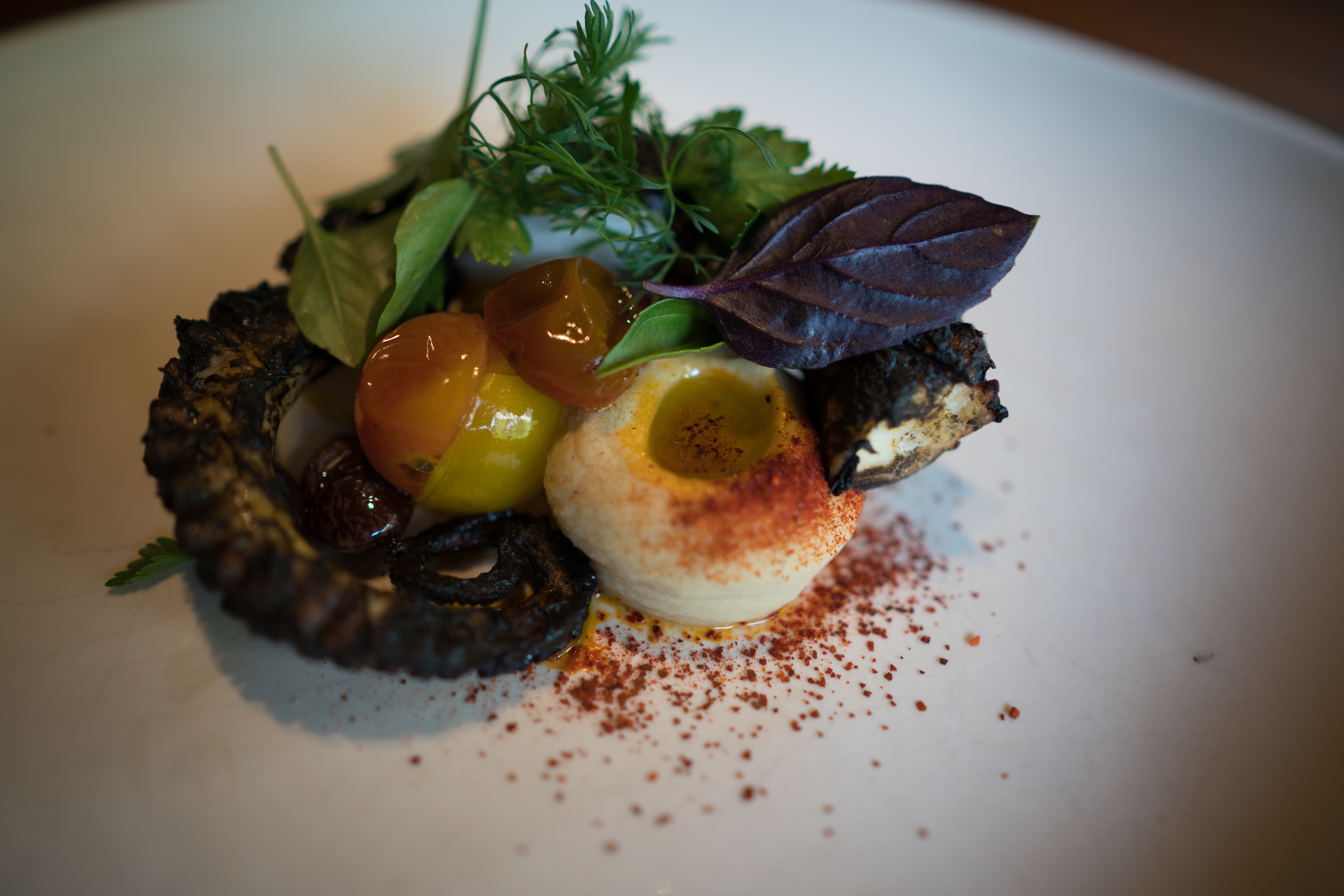
Octopus in habanero ink

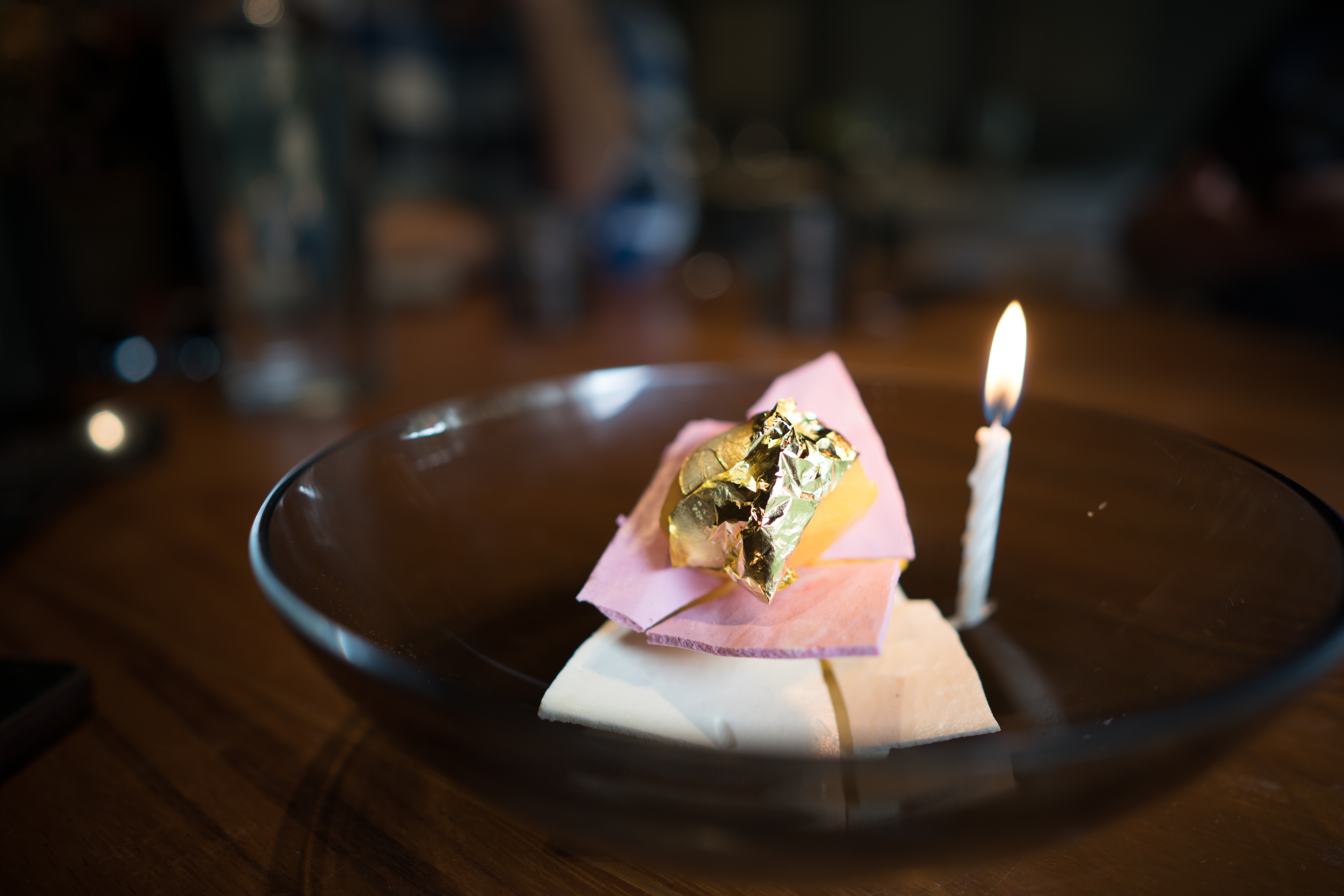
Meringue

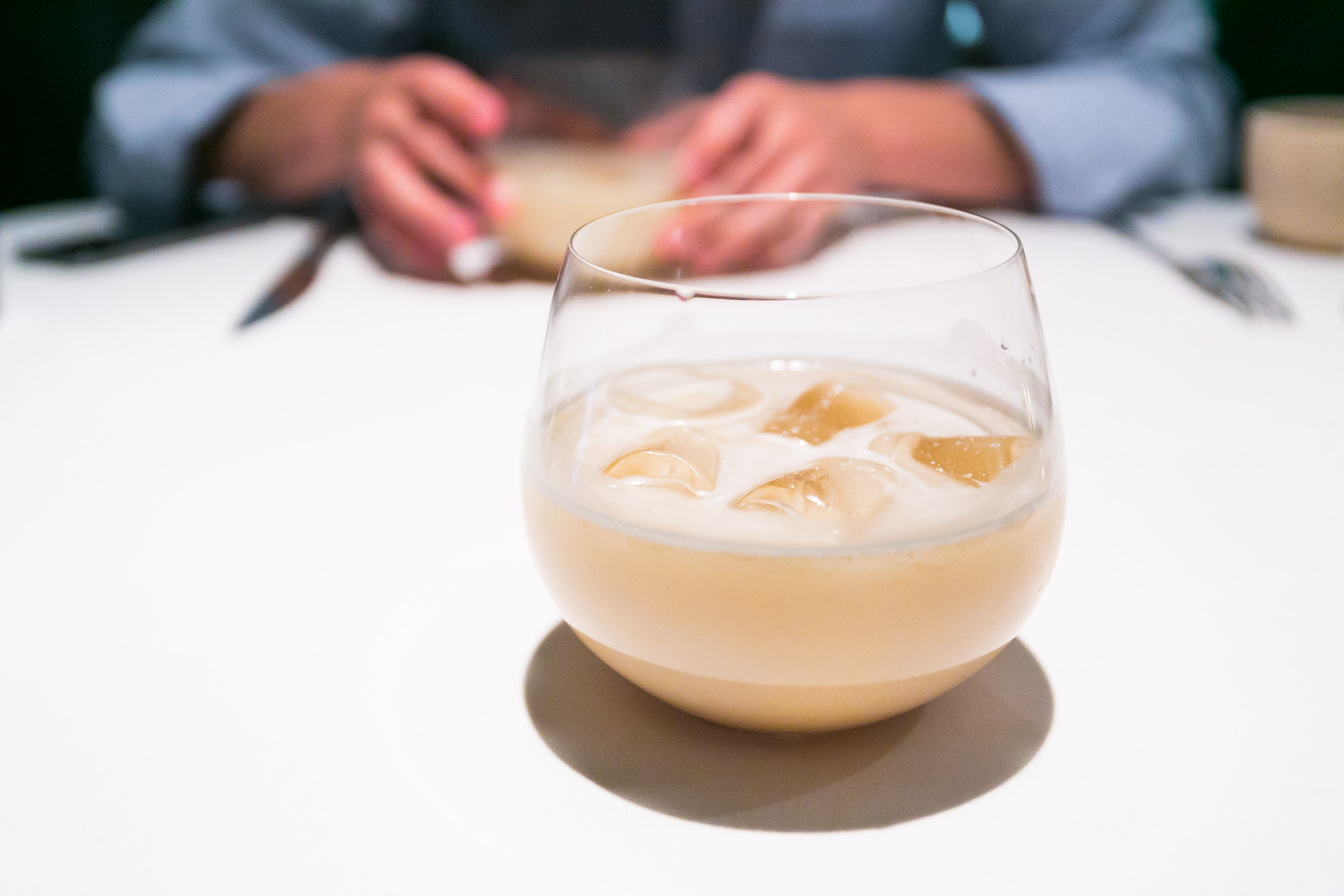
Sunflower seed horchata

== History ==
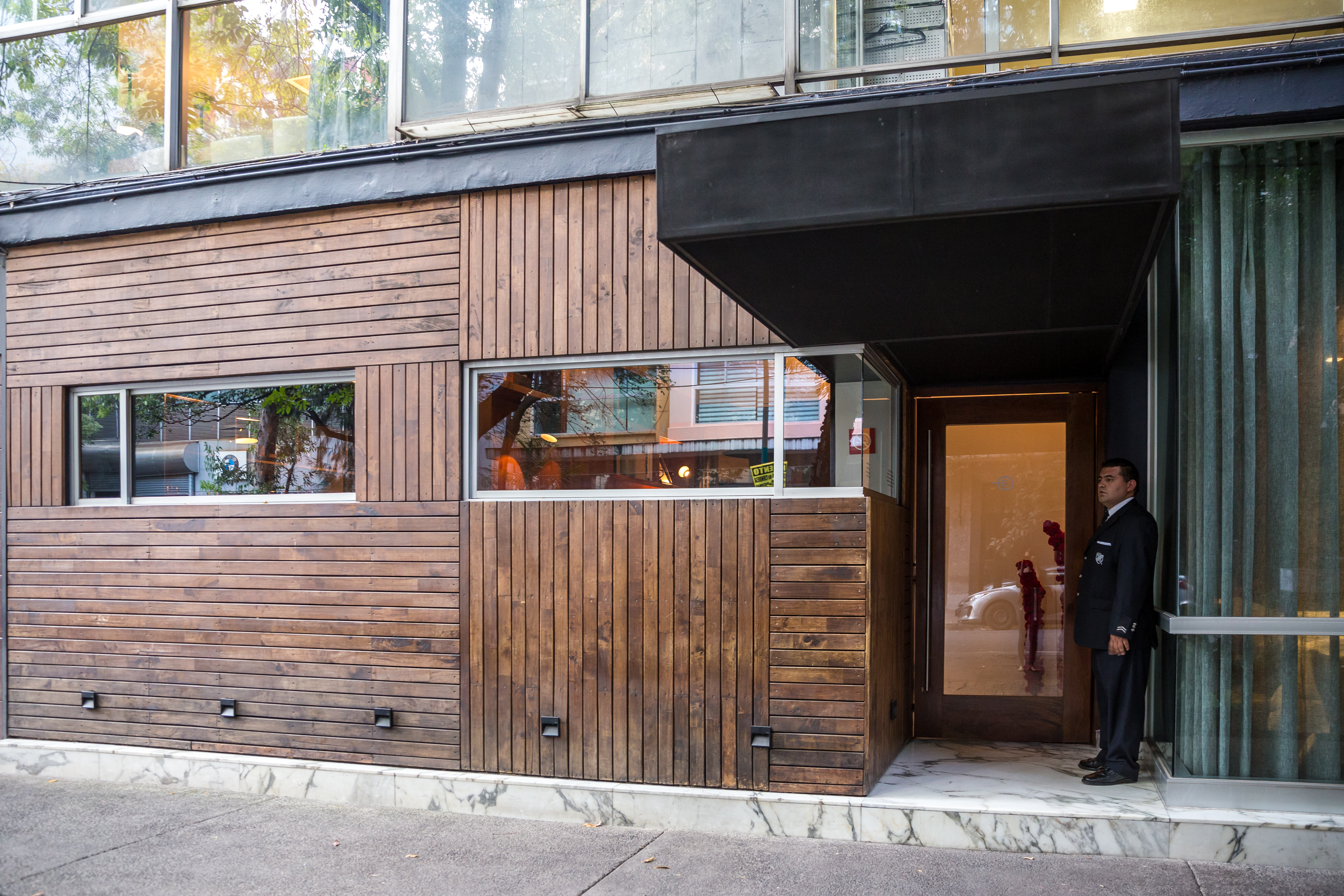
The former location of the restaurant

Twenty-four-year-old chef Enrique Olvera opened Pujol on 6 May 2000 after studying at the Culinary Institute of America. At its inception, the restaurant offered a contemporary cuisine menu focused primarily on foreign dishes, encompassing Eastern Asian and American cuisine. Olvera described the food served as having more foie gras elements than Mexican ones. During this period, the restaurant experienced financial problems, with multiple associates leaving the project. In 2006, the restaurant underwent a renovation and the menu was reoriented toward Mexican cuisine. According to Olvera, they improved "the aesthetics on the plate" and focused on the ingredients to enhance the flavor.

In 2017, Pujol relocated from Francisco Petrarca Street to a 1950s-built house on Tennyson Street, both located in the Polanco neighborhood of Mexico City. Following the move, the restaurant expanded its menu to include a wider variety of tacos. The renovation was led by architect Javier Sánchez, with interior design by Micaela de Bernardi and furniture by Eduardo Prieto, inspired by the works of Clara Porset. Inside the house, walls were removed to open up the space and connect its two sections. A sunlit atrium, which also functions as a small garden, links the areas and brings the outdoors into the interior. The design incorporates gray granite and parquet flooring, timber-slatted ceilings, and low-profile mid-century furniture.

Following the relocation, the restaurant reduced its use of meat and increased the incorporation of Mexican vegetables and ingredients. By 2019, Pujol ceased using meat due to its environmental impact, reserving it only for special events. The restaurant collects rainwater for orchard irrigation, has minimized its use of single-use plastics and gathers leftovers for composting. For its sustainability actions, the United Nations recognized the restaurant in the same year.

In 2018, Olvera opened a gourmet tortilleria in the Condesa neighborhood called Molino Pujol. It sells handmade tortillas produced with a variety of maize, along with maize-based dishes such as esquites, tacos, and quesadillas.

In 2025, Pujol closed for repairs and to remodel the restaurant's terrace. Sánchez was commissioned to oversee the project for a second time, with assistance from Aisha Ballesteros and Benedikt Fahlbusch, who had also collaborated with him in 2017. According to Olvera, the renovation aimed to make customers "feel like home". At the entrance, a volcanic stone bar was installed alongside wooden latticework and a fountain. Landscape architect Hugo Sánchez sourced plants from the plant nursery Dealer de Plantas, including agaves, cacti, and nopals. On the terrace, a pigmented concrete bar with tezontle was added. For the interior, the restaurant incorporated a monumental textile piece created by women from Aguacatenango, Venustiano Carranza, Chiapas, depicting the nearby volcanoes Popocatépetl and Iztaccihuatl as well as Mexican flora. The artisans spent over 2,000 hours embroidering the fabric.

=== Work harassment allegations ===
In 2021, Ximena Abrín applied for a job at the restaurant and was put on a five-day trial period. On the fourth day, she resigned and shared her experience on Facebook. She claimed that the working hours were twice the amount initially offered—up to 16 hours a day—with the minimum monthly salary of 14,000 pesos (approximately 700 US dollars) for a six-day workweek. She stated that the restaurant's reputation did not justify such labor conditions. Her post went viral, prompting multiple former employees to publish their own accounts of working at Pujol, including allegations of workplace harassment, racism, classism, and sexism.

In this regard, Olvera said: "If at some point we have failed, we are more than willing to review it and it is part of a process. [...] I believe we can do better as an industry and we have been trying to do so for several years. [...] ] We've always liked the idea that the people who work with us not only do their job well, but are also happy. [...] It saddens us that at some point there were people who worked at Pujol who didn't have an extraordinary work experience" and added that the restaurant complies with the standards established by local laws. (Note: Original quote in Spanish: Si en algún momento hemos fallado, estamos más que dispuestos a revisarlo y es parte de un proceso. [...] Creo que podemos hacer mejor las cosas como industria y lo hemos intentado hacer desde hace varios años. [...] A nosotros siempre nos ha gustado que la gente que trabaja con nosotros no solamente haga bien su chamba, sino que estén contentos. [...] Nos entristece que en algún momento haya trabajado gente por el restaurante Pujol que no haya tenido una experiencia laboral extraordinaria".)

== Reception and recognition ==
For Elle magazine, Kayla Webley Adler recommended visiting Pujol, suggesting that the restaurant contributed to the city's status as a "foodie mecca". A reviewer for Condé Nast Traveler described it is a landmark eatery in Mexico City. A writer from Fodor's called the experience "educational and hedonistic". A critic from Bon Appétit recommended visiting Pujol and its taco omakase. Leslie Yeh from Lifestyle Asia considered it a must-visit when in Mexico City.

Mia Stainsby, writing for the Vancouver Sun, mentioned that she is usually not impressed by famous restaurants, but she felt contentment during her visit. She labeled the food as high-class and the ambiance as relaxed. However, she was indifferent to the lamb with mint mole and baby potatoes, finding it lacking in tenderness. Nonetheless, she recommended going to Pujol if it fits within the budget. Mariana R. Fomperosa of Milenio advising visitors to set aside expectations and hype when dining at Pujol. She found the food to be good but felt it was overrated.

Felipe Soto Viterbo rated Pujol five out of five stars for Time Out, noting that it was unnecessary to recommend specific dishes, as the menu constantly changes and any dish might not be available when the reader visits. He emphasized that, despite the seasonal menu, Pujol "doesn't go out of style". Separately, Time Out ranked Pujol as the number one restaurant in its list of the top 23 restaurants in Mexico City. Arden Shore from The Infatuation praised Pujol's service, describing it as "warm and smooth", and suggesting that diners would leave "blissful and stuffed" at the end of their meal. Adriana Zehbrauskas, writing for The New York Times, highlighted the "light-filled dining rooms and open spaces" of the restaurant, which she said combine a casual, neighborhood vibe with an intimate atmosphere.

=== Mole madre ===
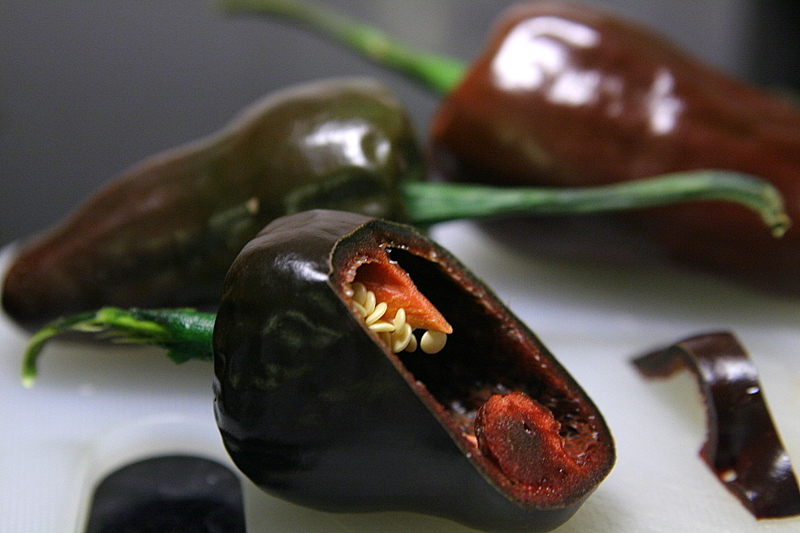
Pujol's mole madre, mole nuevo is made with chilhuacle chili (example pictured).

Mole madre, mole nuevo is the restaurant's signature dish, frequently highlighted in Pujol's reviews. Olvera said it was created for Quintonil's first anniversary in 2013. He asked chef Ricardo Muñoz Zurita to teach him how to prepare his seven-day mole sauce. It is a black mole made with chilhuacle chili. Initially, the leftover mole was served at Pujol, but Olvera began experimenting by reheating it indefinitely. He noticed that its flavor evolved over time. From then on, whenever there are about 10 L (2.2 imp gal; 2.6 U.S. gal) of mole madre left (approximately every two days), chefs add fresh mole made with seasonal ingredients, known as mole nuevo. When serving, the cooks place mole nuevo on top of the mole madre bed and accompany it with an hoja santa tortilla.

While Daniela Brugger called it a "culinary treasure", describing it as "a commitment to quality and tradition [with an] artisanal approach" to the restaurant's cuisine, Shore referred to it as "hypnotic". Stainsby opined it was "deep and complex and beautifully balanced". In contrast, Fomperosa said she preferred her grandmother's, perhaps because she valued love over technique. Renata Lira wrote for Revista de la Universidad de México that the mole sauce exemplifies "the mother and the offspring—wisdom and evolution", describing it as "a tribute to deep cuisine—rural, Indigenous, conventual, Creole, European, Asian, Middle Eastern, revolutionary, street, home-style, and feminine".

=== Awards ===
William Reed Ltd has ranked Pujol on its World's 50 Best Restaurants lists multiple times: at number 5 (2022), 9 (2021), 12 (2019), 13 (2018 and 2023), 16 (2015), 17 (2013), 20 (2014 and 2017), 25 (2016), 33 (2024), 36 (2012), and 49 (2011). There was no list in 2020 due to the impact of the COVID-19 pandemic on the food industry. In 2025, it dropped to the 60th place. For the 2022 edition, Pujol's highest year, Restaurant added, "[t]he Best Restaurant in North America 2022 boasts the best of Mexican gastronomy, with diners flocking to try the signature Mole Madre, Mole Nuevo – plated as concentric rings and aged for a staggering 2,500 days".

When the Michelin Guide debuted in 2024 in Mexico, it awarded 18 restaurants with Michelin stars. Pujol and Quintonil obtained two stars each, meaning "excellent cooking, worth a detour"—and tied for the highest number of stars received in the country. The guide added: "the culinary heart of [Pujol] lies in the seasonal tasting menu. [...] The savory progression culminates with mole madre, an effort like no other that celebrates Mexican history and cuisine in the most profound way". Additionally, Molino Pujol received a Bib Gourmand rating, which recognizes "exceptionally good food at moderate prices".

Pujol, along with six other Michelin-starred restaurants in Mexico City, was honored by Martí Batres, the head of the Mexico City government. He presented the chefs with an onyx statuette in appreciation of their role in promoting tourism in the capital city. The statuette, inspired by the pre-Hispanic sculpture The Young Woman of Amajac, pays tribute to the important contributions of Indigenous women to both national and international gastronomy.

Miguel Ángel González Barragán was named Head Waiter of the Year by the México Gastronómico guide, published by Larousse Cocina in 2025.

== See also ==
- List of Mexican restaurants
- Local food
