= Enrique Olvera =

Mexican chef (born 1976)

- Born: January 29, 1976 (age 50); Mexico City, Mexico
- Education: The Culinary Institute of America
- Culinary career
- Cooking style: Mexican cuisine, Molecular Gastronomy
- Current restaurants: Pujol; Eno; Manta; Cosme; Moxi; Teo; Atla; Damian

Enrique Olvera (born 1976) is a Mexican chef. He is the owner and head chef of the two Michelin-starred restaurant Pujol, a Mexican haute cuisine eatery in Mexico City, which was ranked 9th in the world according to the 2021 annual The World's 50 Best Restaurants listing. He also created the onboard menu in the business class of airline Aeroméxico.

== Career ==
He graduated from the Culinary Institute of America in 1997 with an associate's degree and 1999 with a Culinary Institute of America bachelor degree in 1999. He has won several awards.

== Film ==
Olvera appeared on Netflix Chef's Table in Season 2, Episode 4.

Olvera was a judge on the first episode of the 2018 Netflix series The Final Table.

Olvera and his restaurant Pujol was featured in the first season of Netflix series Somebody Feed Phil, in the episode "Mexico City"

Olvera also appeared in Season 12 of MasterChef UK

Olvera appears in the third episode of the 2020 Amazon-produced series Pan y Circo, where he prepares a meal for guests discussing the legalization of cannabis in Mexico.

Olvera appears on the show Ugly Delicious season 1, in the episode: "Tacos"

== Bibliography ==
Enrique Olvera has published 3 English-language books. They are:

Olvera, Enrique Tu Casa Mi Casa (March 2019). Mexican Recipes for the Home Cook. Phaidon Press. ISBN 978-0714878058

Olvera, Enrique, Mexico from the Inside Out (October 2015). Phaidon Press ISBN 978-0714869568

Olvera, Enrique Sunny Days, Taco Nights (June, 2025) Phaidon Press ISBN 978-1838669881
