= Cuisine of Chiapas =

Style of cooking

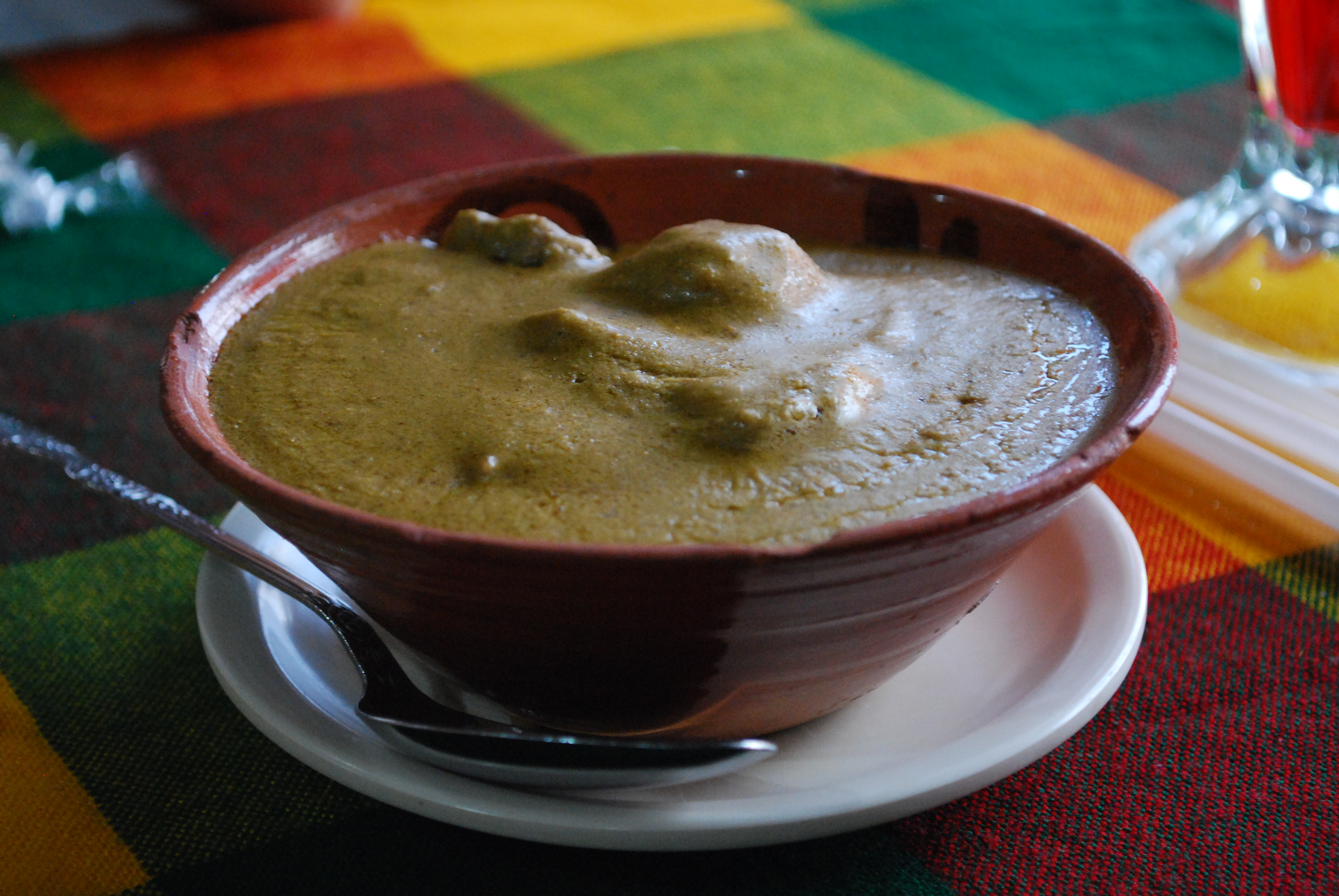
Pepita con Tasajo served at a restaurant in Chiapa de Corzo.

The cuisine of Chiapas is a style of cooking centered on the Mexican state of the same name. Like the cuisine of rest of the country, it is based on corn with a mix of indigenous and European influences. It distinguishes itself by retaining most of its indigenous heritage, including the use of the chipilín herb in tamales and soups, used nowhere else in Mexico. However, while it does use some chili peppers, including the very hot simojovel, it does not use it as much as other Mexican regional cuisines, preferring slightly sweet seasoning to its main dishes. Large regions of the state are suitable for grazing and the cuisine reflects this with meat, especially beef and the production of cheese. The most important dish is the tamal, with many varieties created through the state as well as dishes such as chanfaina, similar to menudo and sopa de pan. Although it has been promoted by the state of Chiapas for tourism purposes as well as some chefs, it is not as well known as other Mexican cuisine, such as that of neighboring Oaxaca.

== Ingredients ==
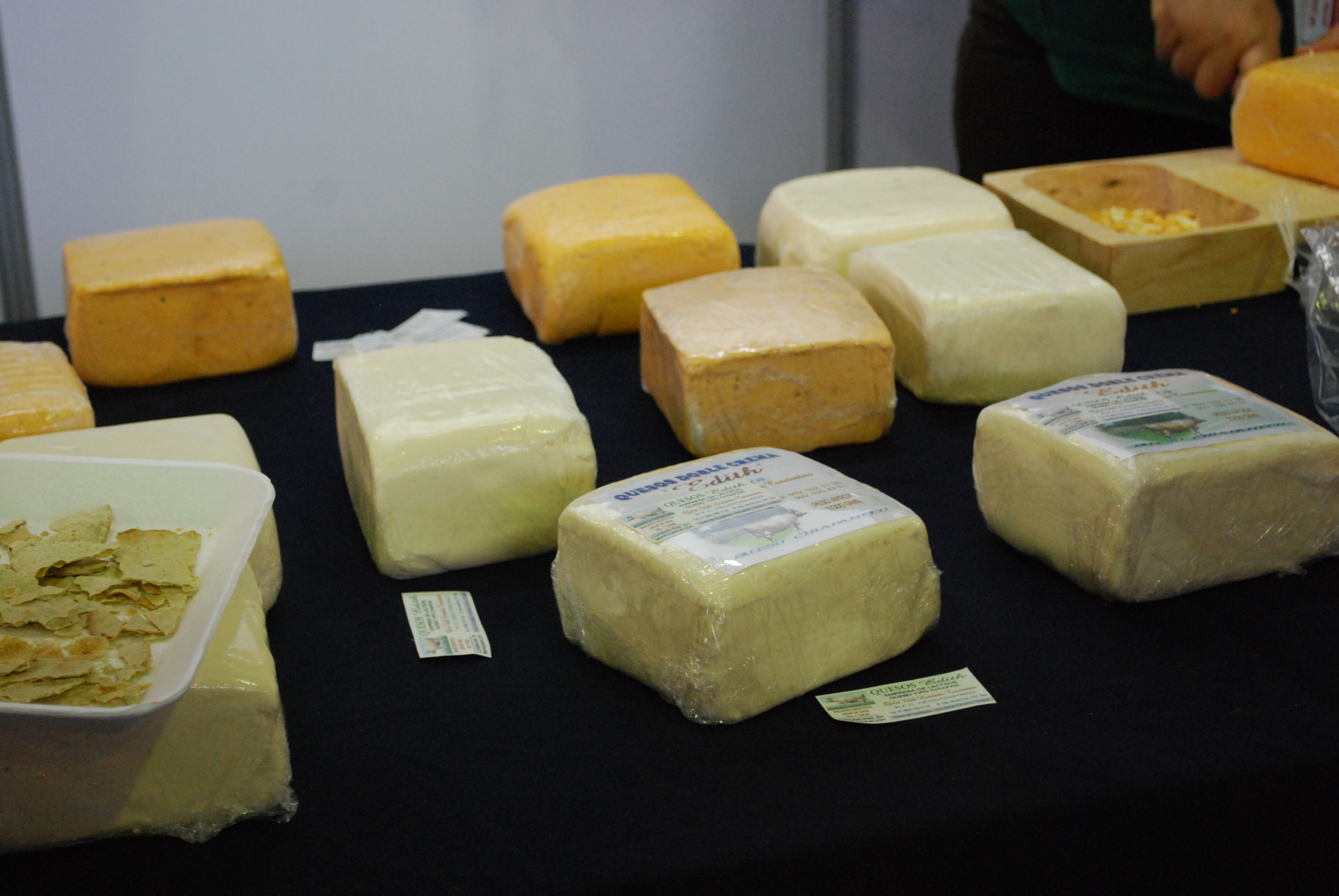
Various cheese from Chiapas on display at an event in Mexico City

Like most of the rest of Mexican cooking, the cuisine of Chiapas is mostly a blending of indigenous and Spanish ingredients and cooking techniques. Chiapan cooking is still heavily influenced by the indigenous, especially the use of native herbs such as chipilín, a fragrant, thin leaved plant used most often in tamales and soups and hoja santa, which is used in much of southern Mexican cooking. The cuisine is based on the Mesoamerican staple of corn, most often found in tortillas and tamales, but also in a number of preparations including drinks. Other indigenous ingredients include chili peppers, cacao beans, beans, avocados and an edible flower called “cuchunuc” . A number of wild plants are still eaten including radishes, mustard, sour tomatoes and a variety of mushrooms. Cacaoite, is a seed which is ground to along with those of squash and to make sauces. In rural areas, meats such as armadillo, tepezcuintle, iguana, wild boar, rabbit, and various native birds are still eaten. Chiapas cuisine favors black beans, although some areas such as San Juan Chamula consume a variety. Beans are generally prepared simply just with salt and chili pepper, generally without fat.

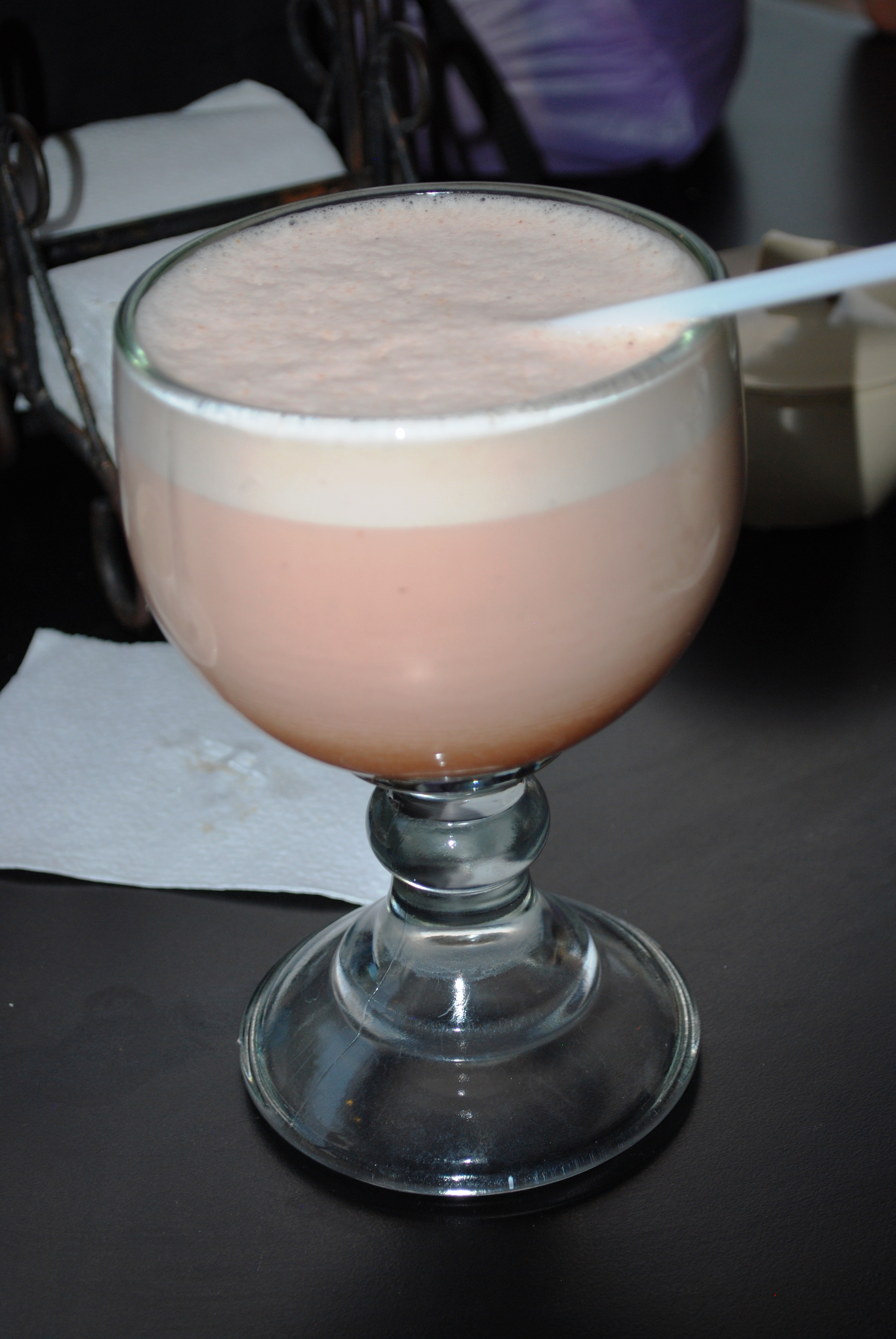
Drink called tascalate served in Palenque

Since the Spanish conquest, a number of ingredients have been added to the cuisine. Spanish influence is mostly seen with the introduction of meats such as beef, pork and chicken, with beef as the most popular. Much of the terrain is ideal for cattle ranching and since the colonial period, the raising of cattle and sheep has been an important economic activity. One notable beef dish is grilled strips called tasajo which is served with a variety of sauces. The raising of cattle has also spurred a cheese industry, most of which is still made on ranches and small cooperatives. The main cheese making areas are Ocosingo, Rayón and Pijijiapan. Rounds of white cheese from Ocosingo are popular with gourmets in various parts of Mexico. The colder areas of the state make cured meats. Crops which have been introduced include coffee, soybeans, cotton, sugar and a wide variety of exotic tropical fruit.

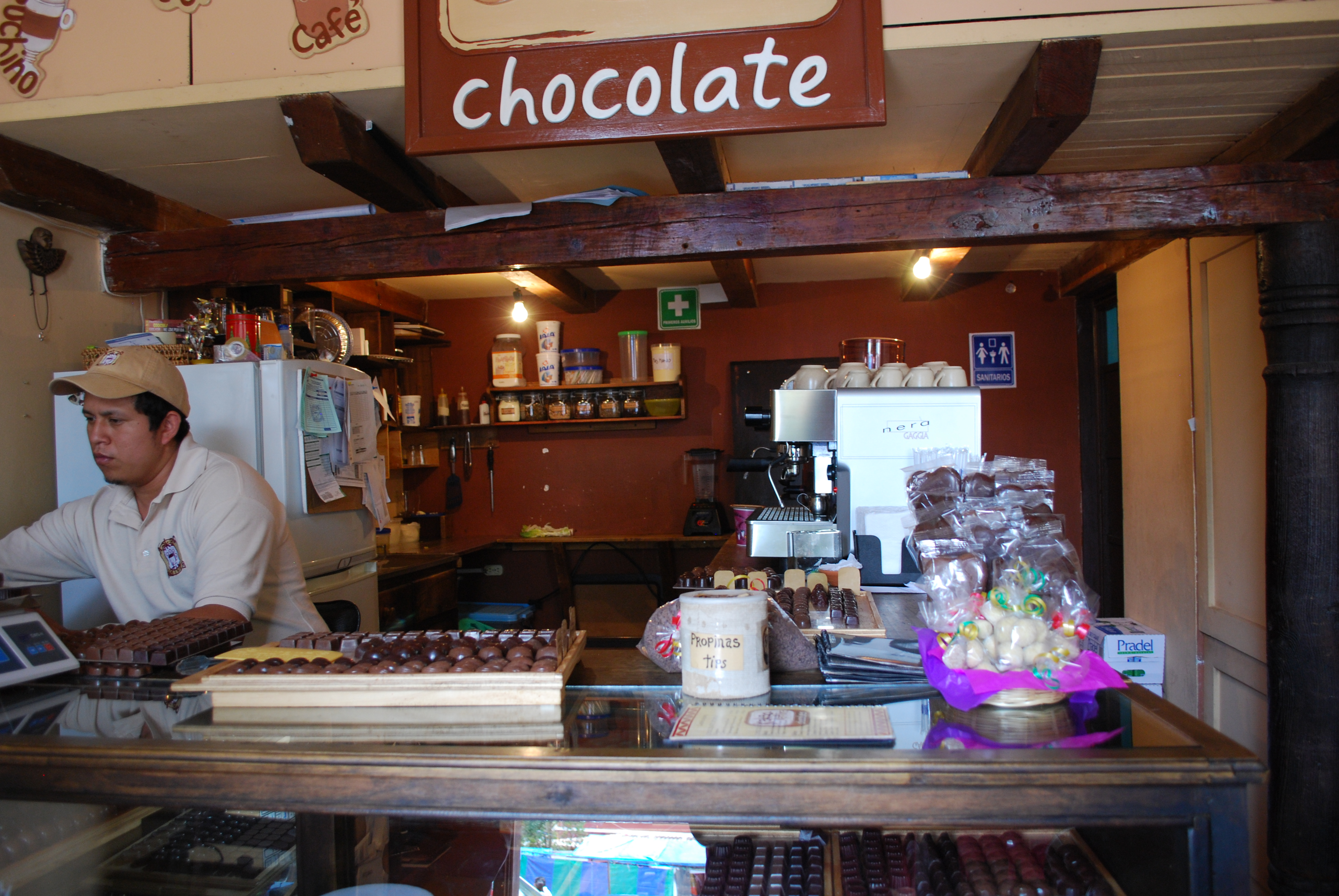
Counter at Kakao Natura chocolate shop in San Cristobal

Chiapas cuisine does not rely as heavily on chili peppers as the other regional Mexican cuisines. They mostly appear in condiments. Regional chili peppers include the “chile de siete caldos” (chili pepper of the seven broths) indicating that one is sufficient to flavor all seven and the simojovel, which is far too hot to be used in quantity. Chiapan food favors a combination of slightly sweet seasonings in the main dishes, which include tomatoes, cinnamon, plantains, prunes and pineapple. The Chiapas version of chile relleno includes peas, almonds, peaches, dried candied pineapple and raisins.

There have been some foreign influences on the cuisine from the immigration of Germans, English, French and Asians after that of the Spanish. German contributions included the development of a coffee-growing industry as well as the making of beer and cured meats in some areas. Coffee is an important crop in the Soconusco area, much of which is exported and attracts tourism.

Today, popular cultivated crops found in the cuisine include squashes, potatoes, fava beans, chayote, cabbage, cucumbers, sweet potatoes, yucca, various melons, watermelon, mango, papaya, sapodilla, soursop, cherimoya, mamey sapote, pitahaya, cupapé (Cordia dodecandra).

== Popular dishes ==
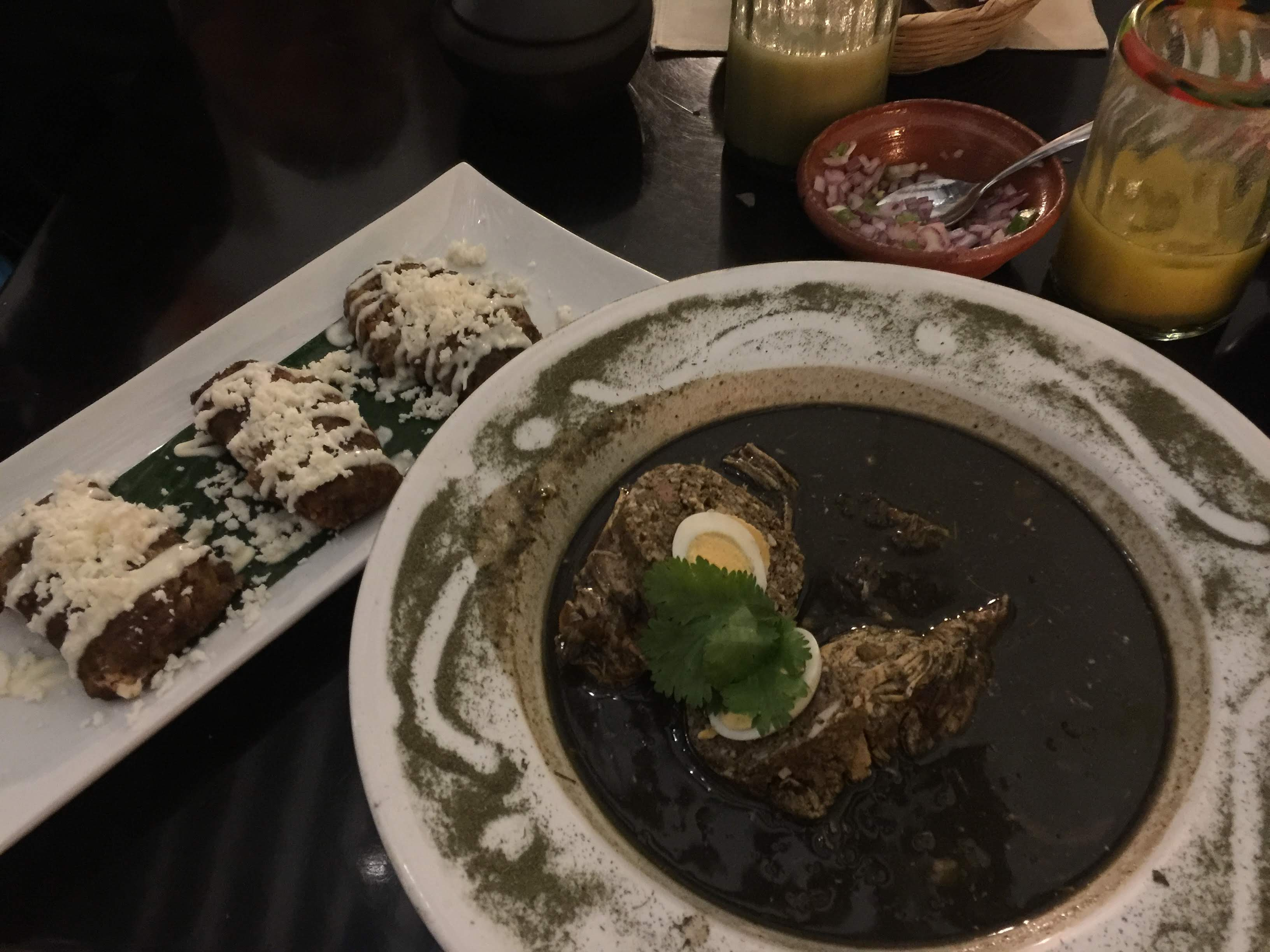
Comida grande chiapaneca.

The most prominent and popular dish in Chiapas is tamales, found in many varieties. Chiapas’s main herbs of chipilín and hoja santa can be found in many of these. Most varieties are wrapped in banana leaves, but they can also be found wrapped in corn husks and even in the leaves of hoja santa. Important varieties include jacuané (local name for hoja santa), de bola (pork in a chirmol chili pepper sauce), turtle, iguana and fish. Another dish found in a number of varieties is chanfaina, which is a tripe stew similar to menudo. Sopa de pan (bread soup) is a flavored chicken broth which dried and fried pieces of bread is added at the last minute before eating. In Chiapas, it is popular for special occasions. Other dishes include huevos de vigilia, rollitos de plátano, fideo fiestero, pit barbecued beef, sea bass in its own juice, rice with saffron, frijol escumite con chilpilin, black beans with salted beef, tanate, chumul, caldo de shuti, armadillo stew, nacapitu, cuchunuc, putzatzé, yumimujé, broths flavored with chipilin, fresh corn and meat with vegetables.

Regional drinks include pozol in various preparations (reventado, negro, blanco, cacao and more), sweet drinks made with fruit, tamarind and more, tascalate, atole and hot chocolate. The main alcoholic beverages are those made from sugar cane. These include various prepared from fermented sugarcane as well as the distilled aguardiente, which is also used to conserve fruit.

== Regional specialties ==
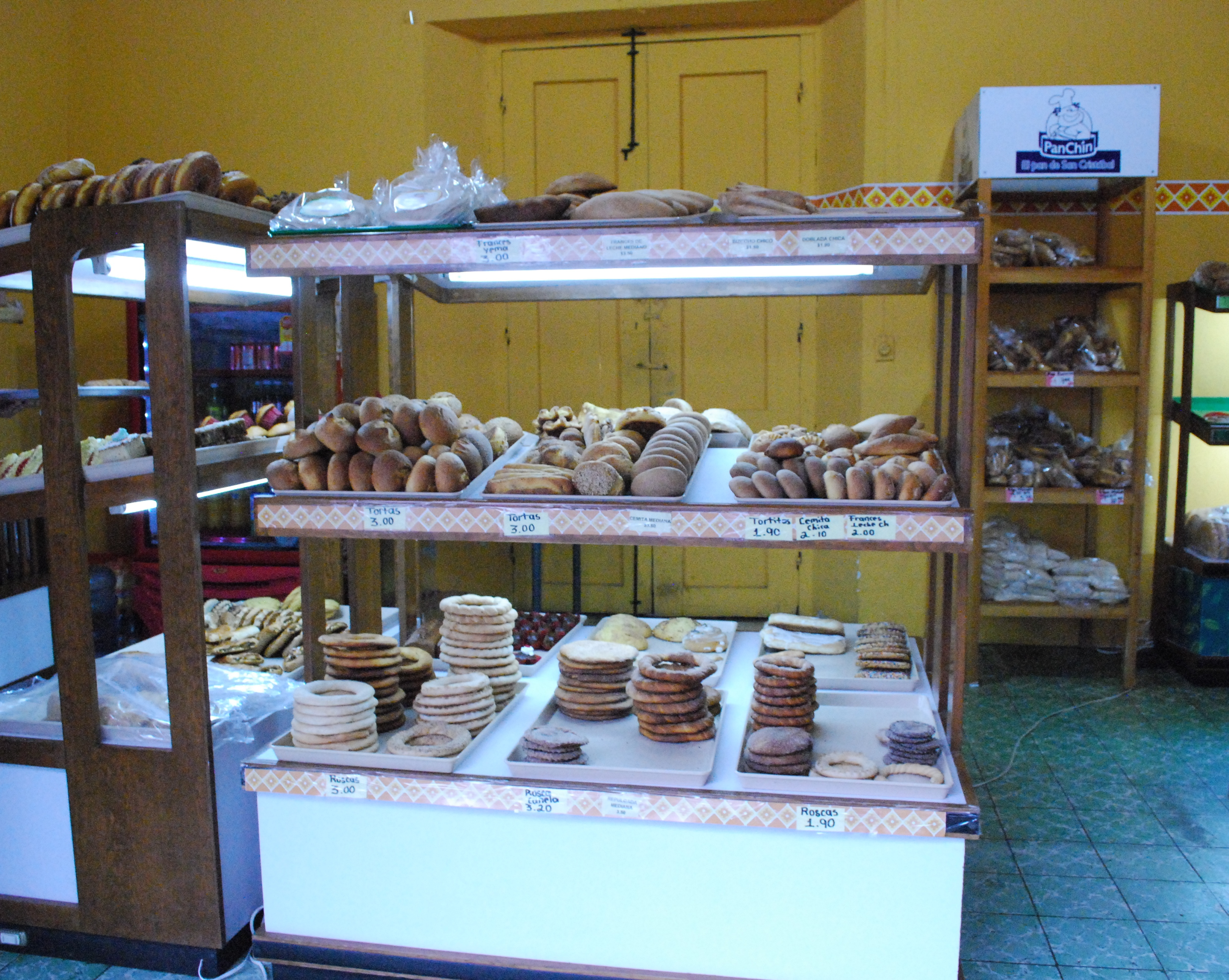
Inside a bakery in San Cristobal de las Casas

Various areas of the state have their own specialties. The state has eighteen recognized indigenous groups, many of which are of Mayan descent. One of the best known of Chiapas’ eighteen indigenous groups are the Lacandones which live in the rainforest of the same name. Most of their dishes are based on corn, which is cooked in kernels (including popped) and as a cooked dough. Their food also features a number of wild mushrooms and a fermented drink called balché . The Zoques in the northwest of the state and central valleys are known for their consumption of a small freshwater snail called chuti. These are generally collected in the spring in streams and ponds. They are most traditionally cooked in a broth flavored with hoja santa, then the broth is thickened with corn dough. The snails are also eaten as a snack or bar food in Tuxtla Gutierrez. Another exotic food from this area is the bee larvae.

The cultural center of the state is San Cristobal de las Casas. Specialties in this city are based mostly on cured meats such as ham and sausages, which are of Spanish origin attributed to Bartolomé de las Casas, as well as indigenous dishes such as various tamales (including one flavored with saffron) . A common street food in San Cristobal is called a cazueleja, which is a roll stuffed with cheese, egg and cinnamon. San Cristobal is also known for its sweets as it is common to consume these with coffee in the late evenings. Sweets include crystallized fruit, coconut candies, a caramel spread called cajeta and various sweet and normal breads, which were introduced to the area by the French.

The major population center of the state is the capital of Tuxtla Gutiérrez with Chiapa de Corzo across the river. Local specialties here include ningüijute, a seed-based pork mole, chispola, a beef and vegetable stew and pictes, a sweet corn tamale. Chiapa de Corzo is also known for cochito horneado or a suckling pig roasted with adobo seasoning for special occasions.

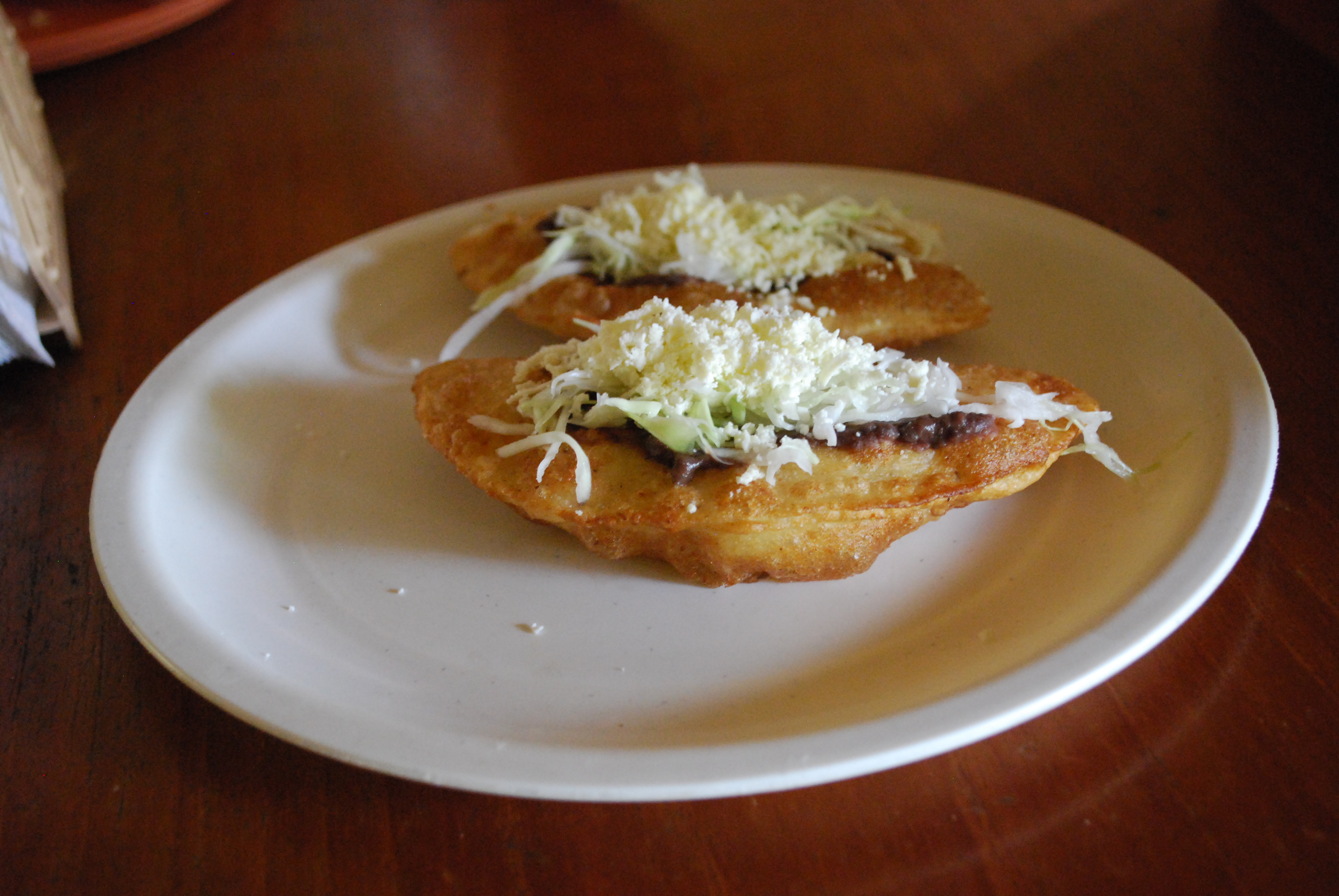
Fried turnovers filled with black beans and other ingredients served at Frontera Corozal.

The cool highlands share the affinity for cured meats, including the city of Comitán . The city is also known for pit barbecued chicken, a salad of hearts of palm in vinaigrette and cheese. They also produce a drink called comiteco, which is fermented from maguey and a drink called mistela, made from fruits such as mango, tejocote and plum.

The coastline, which is separated from the inland by a line of mountains, make use of Pacific coast seafood in its cuisine, including bass, grouper, mojarra, sardines, shrimp, crabs and clams. Shrimp is often dried for later consumption. These shrimp are often combined with tomato salsa for an appetizer or used with black beans and pumpkin seeds as a filling for tamales juacanes.

Palenque is a cattle raising area with good beef dishes as many versions of fried plantains, including ones filled with black beans or cheese.

The commercial agriculture of the Soconusco has attracted immigrants with restaurants serving Chinese, Japanese and German food found in the area. The most notable food in Tapachula is Chinese style, from immigration of Chinese into the area in the late 19th and early 20th centuries.

== Promotion of the cuisine ==
Most Chiapas cooking is humble peasant food and is not as sophisticated or complicated as the neighboring Oaxacan cuisine. The cuisine of the state is not that well known, being less documented than that of Oaxaca, Puebla or Michoacán .

Nonetheless, the cuisine has been promoted internationally by chefs such as Rick Bayless and Erwin Ramos . Starting in the 1990s, the state of Chiapas began to promote the cuisine through events, media and professional culinary associations such as the Corporation Mexicana de Restaurantes. The state also declared the cuisine an intangible heritage and a source of sustainable tourism. It has sponsored culinary festivals such as the Festival de al Autentica Cocina Chiapaneca and culinary competitions for professional chefs using traditional ingredients. One of these is the Alta Cocina Regional y de Author de Chiapas, founded by chef Marta Zepeda of the Tierra y Cielo Hotel in San Cristobal.
