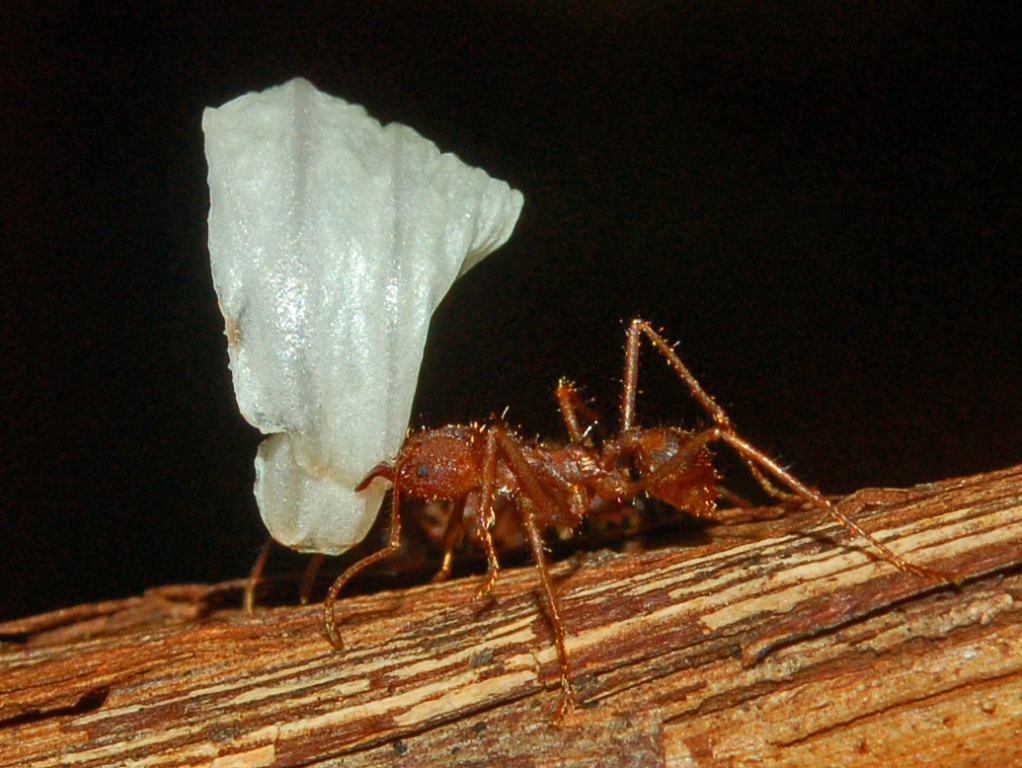
- Worker of Atta mexicana at Montreal Insectarium

Scientific classification
- Kingdom: Animalia
- Phylum: Arthropoda
- Clade: Pancrustacea
- Class: Insecta
- Order: Hymenoptera
- Family: Formicidae
- Subfamily: Myrmicinae
- Genus: Atta
- Species: A. mexicana

Binomial name
- Atta mexicana (F. Smith, 1858)

= Atta mexicana =

Species of ant

Atta mexicana is a species of leaf-cutter ant, a New World ant of the subfamily Myrmicinae of the genus Atta. This species is from one of the two genera of advanced attines (fungus-growing ants) within the tribe Attini.

== Description ==
The queen is approximately 30 mm long, and dark brown. Workers are dark brown, with short spines. The much larger soldiers grow up to 18 mm, and are even more armored with short spines.

The ants cut leaves and grow a basidiomycete fungus called Leucoagaricus gongylophorus (Agaricaceae) with them. Oleic acid is one of their undertaking triggers.

== Distribution ==
A. mexicana is found in Mexico (where it is commonly called hormiga chicatana, hormiga podadora de hoja/desert ant and mochomo), and crosses into Arizona, United States.

This species is highly adaptive, and thrives in such urban areas as Puerto Vallarta. Densities of A. mexicana nests are very high in numerous areas, including the resort community of Nuevo Vallarta.

== Culinary use ==
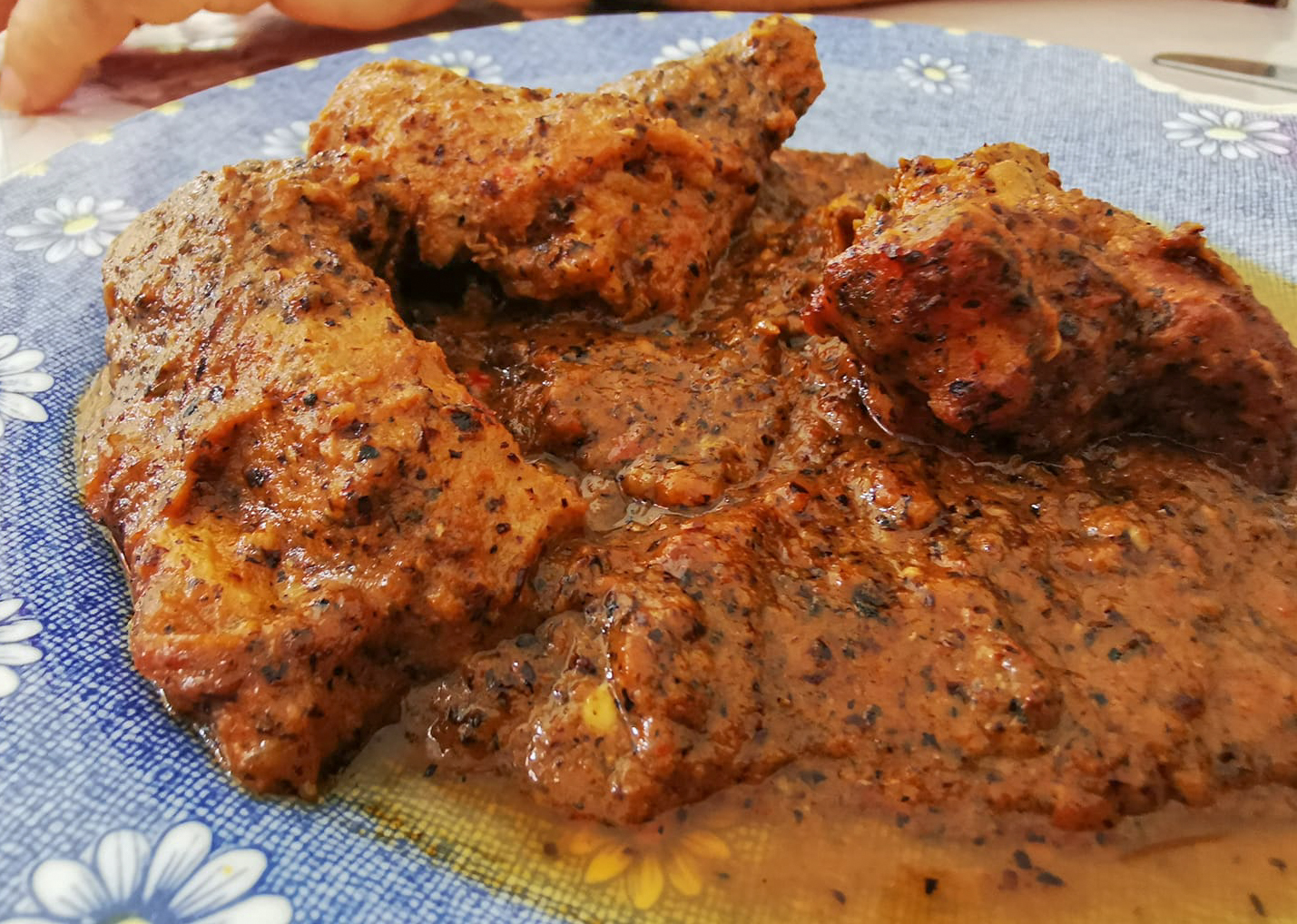
Cooked chicken covered with chicatana sauce

The species is found in various locations of central and southern Mexico during the start of the rainy season, when the soil becomes wet and the ants leave for their nuptial flight. That time of the year is the most active for the chicatanas, during which they clean their anthill and create new colonies, becoming very abundant. In Chiapas, for example, they are harvested from late May to early July. In Tuxtla Gutiérrez, they are known as nucú and are prepared in a stew with the same name; in Chiapa de Corzo and Ocosingo they are respectively called nacasmá and cocosh. They are also widely known in Veracruz, Oaxaca, the mountainous areas of Guerrero, Guanajuato, Puebla, Morelos, and Edomex.

When consumed as snacks (botanas), they are fried with olive oil or toasted on a comal, usually with salt, lemon, and hot sauce, and traditionally accompany the Pox. They are also fried in tacos. In Maya regions, they are stewed in chilmole.

In Mixtec tradition, they are the main ingredient of a sauce called salsa de chicatanas, which is also prepared with chili pepper, onion and garlic and smeared on cooked meat or cheese tortillas. There are several variations of that sauce, such as the one prepared with chile de árbol by the Zoque people of Jamiltepec, the one made with coastal chili in Pinotepa Nacional, and one prepared with guajillo chili in the Mixteca Poblana. In Veracruz, they are included in a pipián called tlatonile.

== Gallery ==
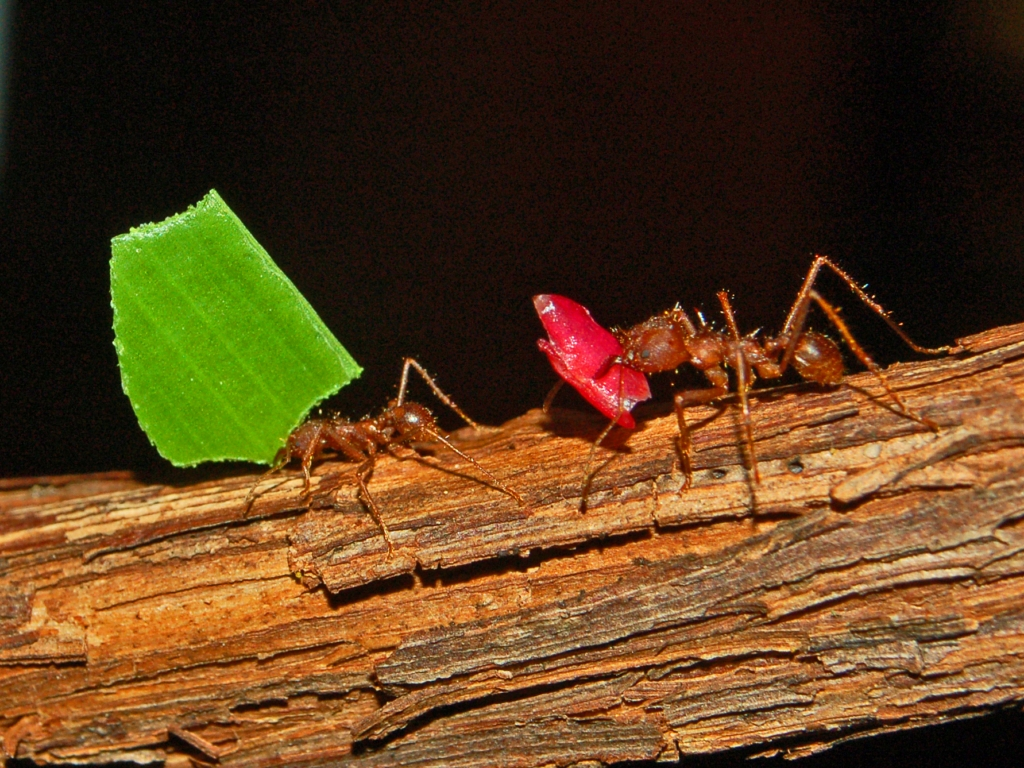
Workers of Atta mexicana at Montreal Insectarium

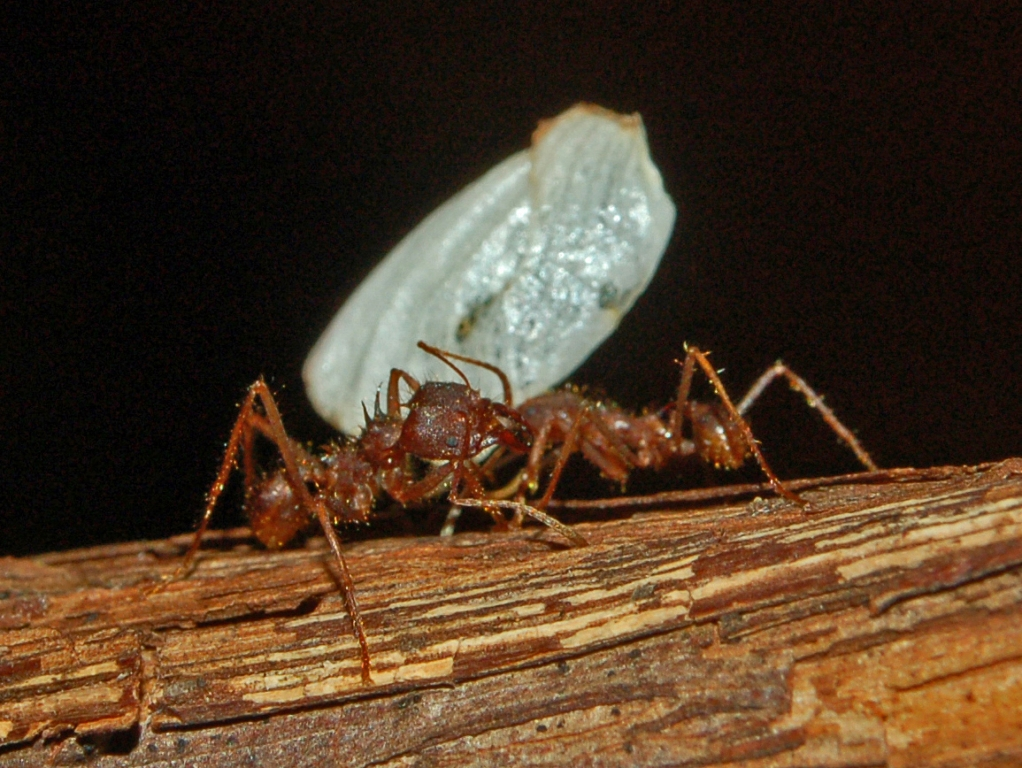
Atta mexicana at Montreal Insectarium

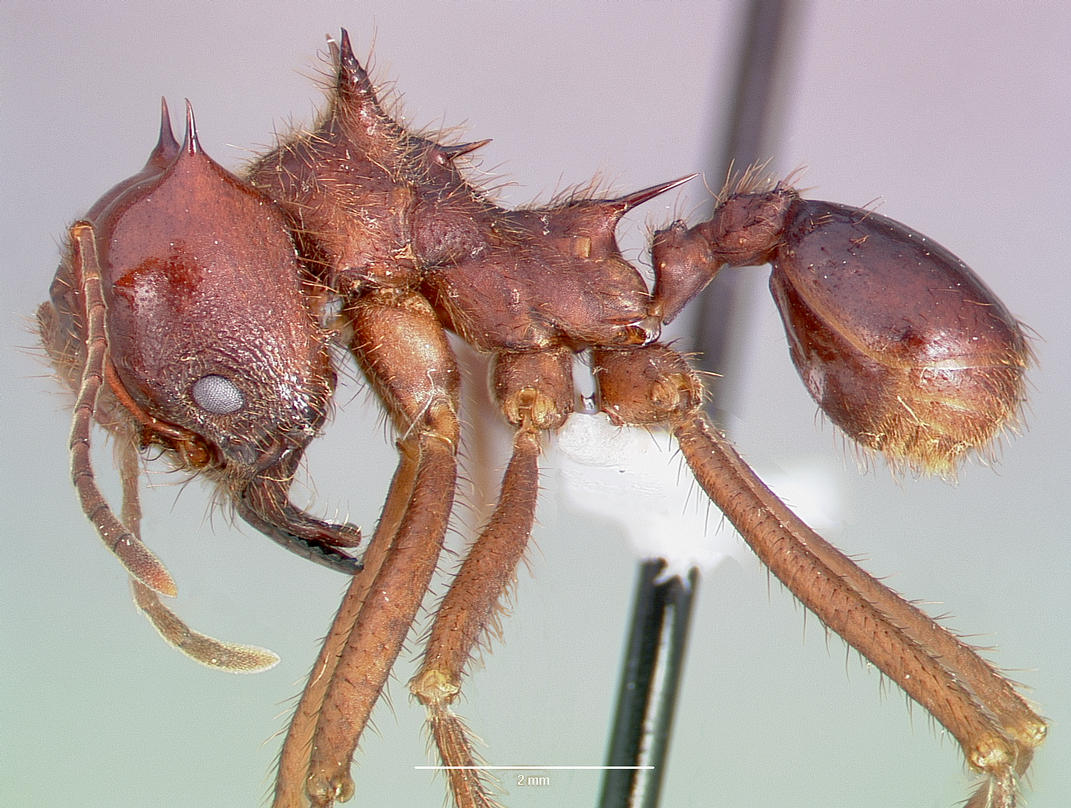
Profile view of ant Atta mexicana

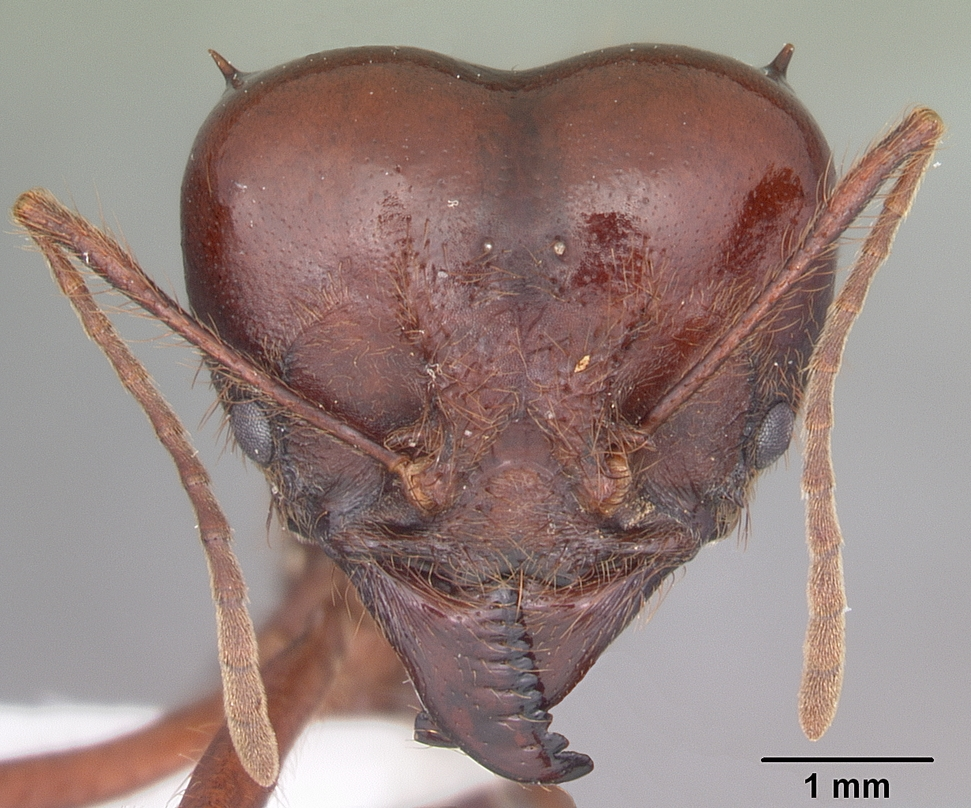
Head view of a soldier ant of Atta mexicana

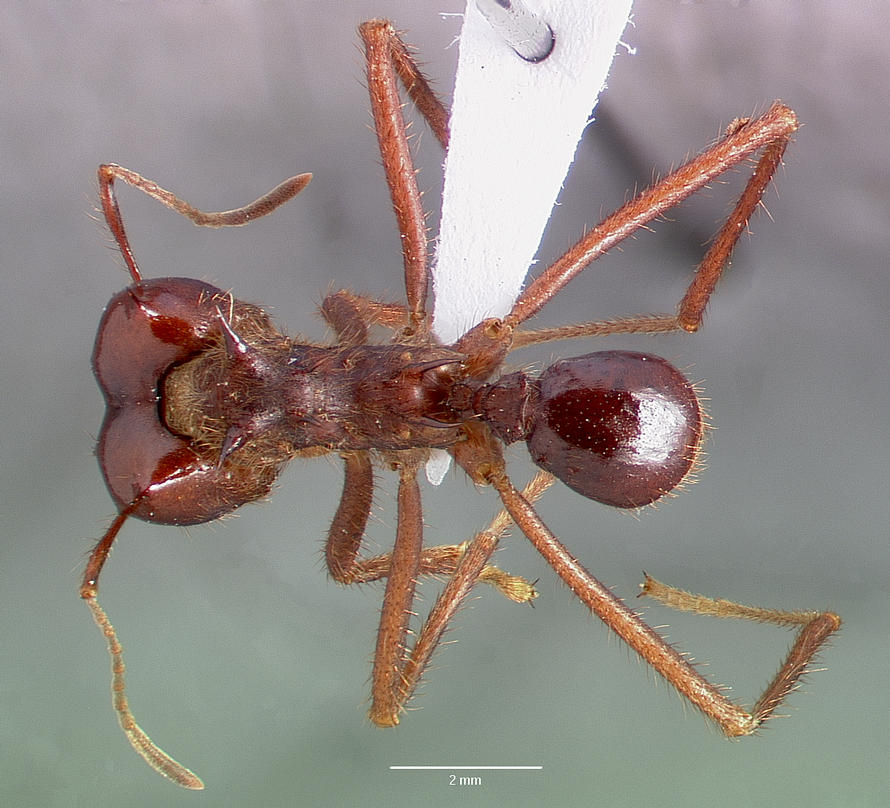
Dorsal view of worker ant of Atta mexicana

== See also ==
- List of leafcutter ants
- Entomophagy – Practice of eating insects by organisms
- Entomophagy in humans – Practice of eating insects in human cultures
- Insects as food – Use of insects as food for humans
- List of edible insects by country
- Chahuis – Mexican name for edible beetles
- Chapulines – Mexican dish of grasshoppers
- Escamol – Edible larvae and pupae of ants
- Jumiles – Stink bugs native to Mexico
- Maguey worm – Edible caterpillars that infest maguey
- Mezcal worm – Insect larva added for flavor to mezcal
