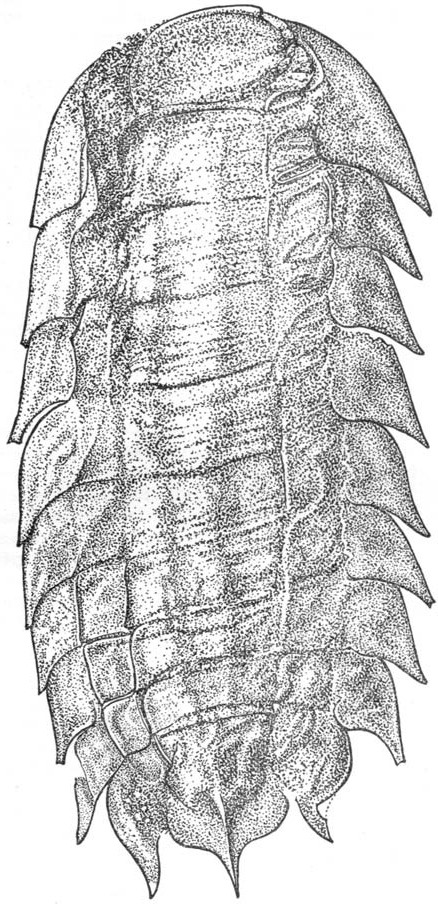
- Fossil illustration

Scientific classification
- Kingdom: Animalia
- Phylum: Arthropoda
- Class: incertae sedis
- Genus: †Camptophyllia; Gill, 1924
- Species: †C. eltringhami

Binomial name
- †Camptophyllia eltringhami Gill, 1924

Synonyms
- Camptophyllia fallax

= Camptophyllia =

Camptophyllia Temporal range: 312–304 Ma Moscovian to Kasimovian

Extinct genus of arthropods

Camptophyllia is a genus of small to average size arthropods (15 to 45 mm or 0.6 to 1.8 in) of uncertain affiliation, that lived during the Upper Carboniferous in what is today England. It has been found exclusively in coal deposits. It is only known from its dorsal exoskeleton. What is known of the anatomy is reminiscent of a woodlouse (or onisciform) with 10 segments, each split by two furrows in a midsection, two lateral sections, and it also has two lateral plates. There is no clear distinction between body parts (or tagmata) such as head, trunk and tail, although the frontal segment is rounded anteriorly, and the posterior segments become narrower, the final one ending rounded with a small backward directed spine. Each segment overlaps the front of the following one. There is one median node or spine and two lateral nodes or spines on every segment. Camptophyllia is known from 11 fossils. Associated trace fossils suggest that the living animal was a deposit feeder. The fossil bodies were associated with trackway and there was a muddy siltstone which concludes that they deposited in a lacustrine environment.

== Distribution ==
Camptophyllia eltringhami is known from the Upper Carboniferous of England (Westphalian A = Moscovian, Crock Hey, Wigan, Greater Manchester; Coseley, Dudley, West Midlands; Westhoughton, Lancashire; Sparth Bottoms, Lancashire; and Westphalian B = Kasimovian, Tyne Coalfield, Crawcrook, Durham).
