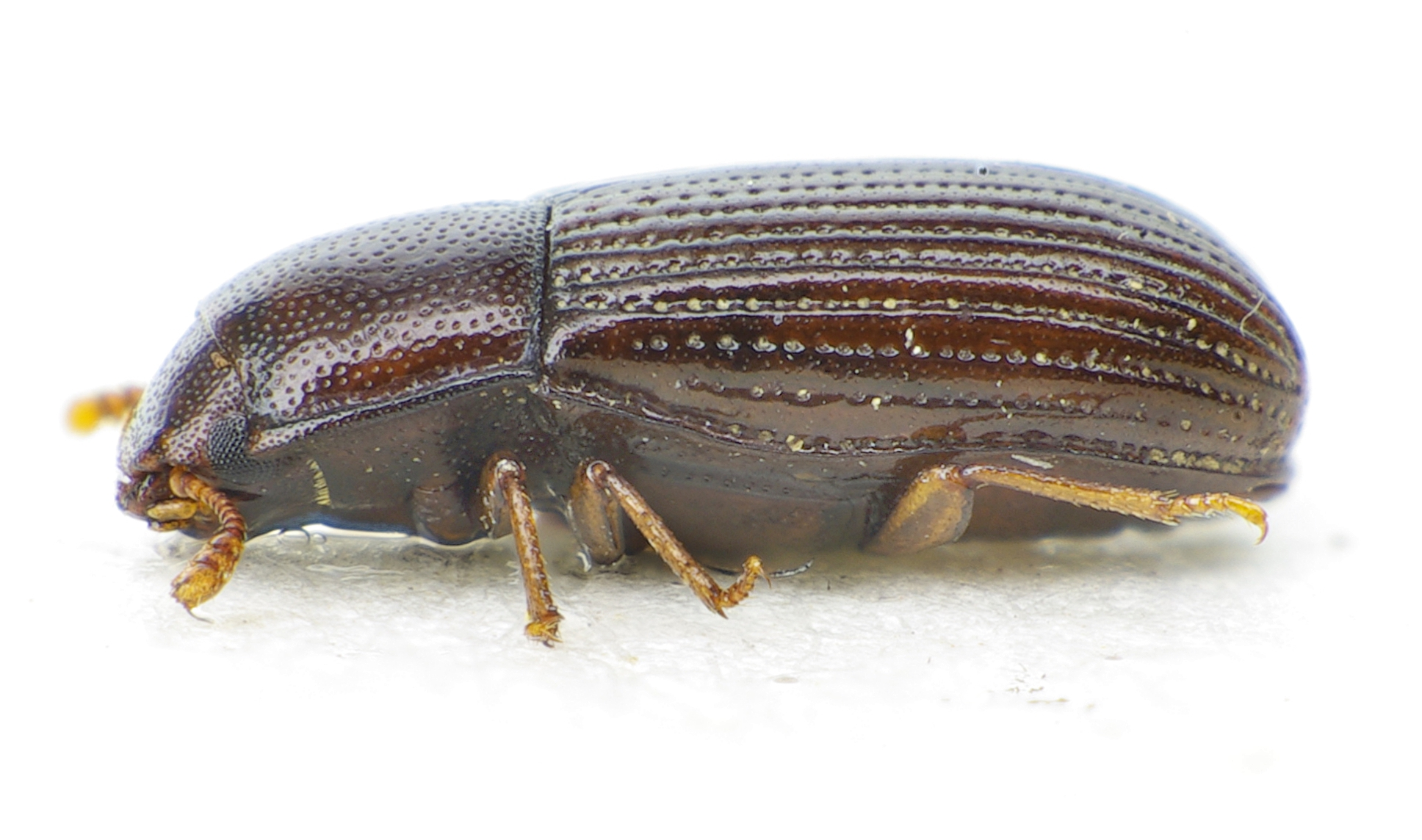
- Clamoris crenata, Spain

Scientific classification
- Domain: Eukaryota
- Kingdom: Animalia
- Phylum: Arthropoda
- Class: Insecta
- Order: Coleoptera
- Suborder: Polyphaga
- Infraorder: Cucujiformia
- Family: Tenebrionidae
- Subfamily: Phrenapatinae; Solier, 1834

Tribes
- Archaeoglenini Watt, 1975; Penetini Lacordaire, 1859; Phrenapatini Solier, 1834

= Phrenapatinae =

Subfamily of beetles

Phrenapatinae is a subfamily of darkling beetles in the family Tenebrionidae. There are more than 20 genera in Phrenapatinae, grouped into 3 tribes.

== Genera ==
These genera belong to the subfamily Phrenapatinae:

- Afrotagalus Gebien, 1942
- Aphtora Bates, 1872
- Archaeoglenes Broun, 1893
- Archeophthora Kaszab, 1978
- Clamoris Gozis, 1886
- Cleolaus Champion, 1886
- Daochus Champion, 1886
- Delognatha Lacordaire, 1859
- Dioedus Leconte, 1862
- Endroeditagalus Schawaller & Bouchard, 2019
- Exechophthalmus Ardoin, 1974
- Falsotagalus Kaszab, 1977
- Leleupium Kaszab, 1956
- Madagassa Koch, 1950
- Molion Champion, 1886
- Nanotagalus Gebien, 1942
- Neotagalus Kaszab, 1955
- Peneta Lacordaire, 1859
- Phrenapates Gray, 1831
- Pseudophthora Kaszab, 1970
- Pycnochilus C.O. Waterhouse, 1879
- Scolytocaulus Fairmaire, 1896
- Sepilokus Iwan & Ras, 2020
- Tagalinus Kaszab, 1977
- Tagalopsis Kaszab, 1955
- Taiwanotagalus Masumoto, 1982
- Telchis Champion, 1886
- Zypoetes Champion, 1893
