= Animal husbandry =

Management of farm animals

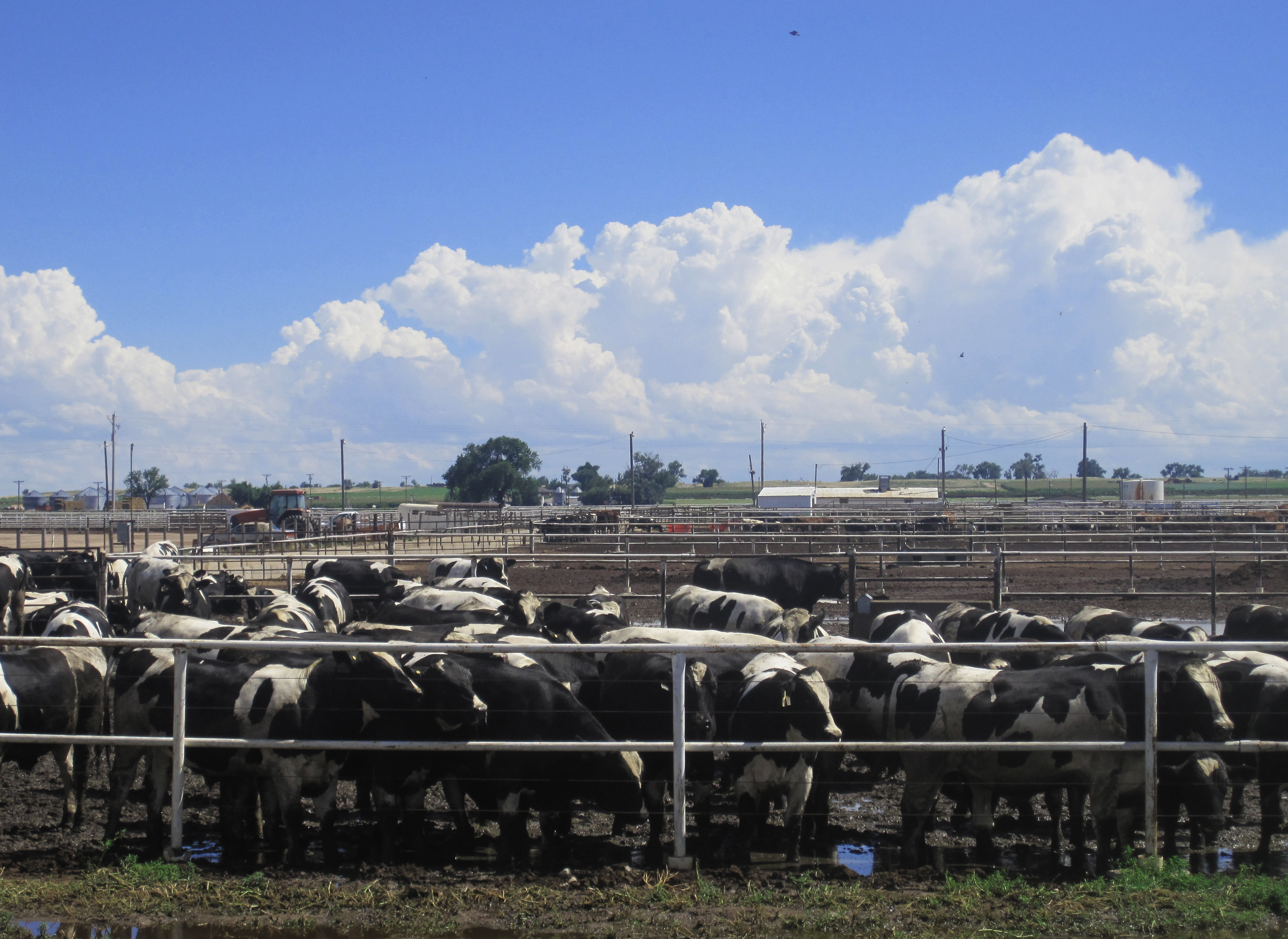
Cattle feedlot in Colorado, United States

Animal husbandry is the branch of agriculture concerned with the human practices of raising captive or domesticated animals for harvesting valuable animal products or to train animals to provide labour or services. It involves the day-to-day management, feeding, nutrition and health, selective breeding, assisted birth, grooming, marketing and harvest of products such as meat, milk, eggs, fibre and hide of primarily domesticated terrestrial mammals (cattle, sheep/goats, horses, pigs, etc.) and birds (i.e. poultry, mainly chicken, ducks and geese) collectively known as livestock, although the practice can be extended to various reptiles (e.g. crocodile, snake and turtle farming) and amphibians (e.g. frog farming) — collectively known as herpetoculture — and insects (e.g. beekeeping, sericulture, maggot and cockroach farming) and worms (e.g. earthworm and leech farming), as well as the cultivation of aquatic animals (aquaculture) such as fish, crustaceans (e.g. shrimps, crabs, crayfish and lobsters), molluscs (e.g. clams, oysters, abalones, geoducks and potentially coleoids) and echinoderms (primarily sea cucumbers).

Animal husbandry has a long history, and was an important part of the human evolution from nomadic hunter-gatherers to agrarian/pastoralist societies that are either sedentary or semi-nomadic. Human domestication of vertebrates first started with taming of dogs more than 17,500 years ago, preceding the Neolithic Revolution, which started around 13,000 BC with the artificial cultivation of the first crops and tame animals. In early Bronze Age civilizations like Ancient Egypt, Sumeria, Indus and China, livestock such as cattle, sheep, goats and pigs were already being raised on farms as supplementary produce, while herding of grazing livestock was the dominant way of life among the nomadic pastoralist tribes and horseback confederacies of Inner Asia and northern Africa. Major changes took place in the Columbian exchange, when Old World livestock were brought to the New World, and then in the British Agricultural Revolution of the 18th century, when livestock breeds like the Dishley Longhorn cattle and Lincoln Longwool sheep were rapidly improved by agriculturalists such as Robert Bakewell, to yield more meat, milk and wool. In the contemporary era, a wide range of species, particularly those from the genera Bos , Ovis, Sus, Gallus and Anas, are raised commercially in large quantities for slaughter by the meat industry, to provide eggs as food or to harvest milk for making dairy products. Less common species such as water buffalo, deer, llama/alpaca, turkeys, quails, rabbits and guinea pigs, as well as insect farming, are raised in selective regions of the world for the food, textile/clothing and pharmaceutical industries. Nowadays, aquaculture such as freshwater and seawater fish farming (mariculture), shrimp farming, crab farming, oyster farming and aquaculture of sea cucumber, are also widespread due to non-sustainable depletion of natural aquatic stocks in wild fisheries due to overharvesting and other detrimental environmental impact of industrial fishing.

Animals are also raised and trained to provide services for human activities, with the best example being the domestication of horses. The use of equine species (horses and donkeys) and their hybrids (mules) for transportation and for military tasks had been widespread in logistics, warfare and law enforcement by both agrarian civilizations and nomadic empires. The horse industry — which includes the breeding, training, grooming and trading of horses — had remained an essential economic sector up to the early 20th century, until the transport value of horses was finally diminished by the proliferation of motor vehicles following the Second Industrial Revolution. Large cattle and domestic buffalo, collectively called oxen, were also used extensively as heavy-duty draft animals to pull wagons and ploughs that demand more strength and stamina than horses, and still remain used in this day in many underdeveloped regions whose infrastructures or terrains cannot support motorization or industrial farming. Another prominent example is dogs, which have been bred, trained and used as guard animals and as hunting companions since prehistory, and dog sleds are still a popular transport option in many regions with arctic wilderness where the expansive snowfields are too difficult and/or too costly to traverse for motor vehicles and horses. Domesticated camels are also still popular in desert regions with no existing roads.

Modern animal husbandry relies on production systems adapted to the available land. Subsistence farming is being superseded by intensive animal farming in the more developed parts of the world, where, for example, beef cattle are kept in high-density feedlots, and thousands of chickens may be raised in broiler houses or batteries. On poorer soil, such as in uplands, animals are often kept more extensively and may be allowed to roam widely, foraging for themselves. Animal agriculture at modern scale drives climate change, ocean acidification, and biodiversity loss. Most livestock are herbivores, except (among the most commonly-kept species) for pigs and chickens, which are omnivores. Ruminants like cattle and sheep are adapted to feed on grass; they can forage outdoors or may be fed entirely or in part on fodders richer in energy and protein such as pelleted cereals. Pigs and poultry cannot digest the cellulose in forage and require other high-protein foods. Domesticated animals are also used to complement crops in polyculture setups such as the rice-duck and rice-fish systems.

== Etymology ==
The verb to husband, meaning "to manage carefully", derives from an older meaning of husband, which in the 14th century referred to the ownership and care of a household or farm, but today means the "control or judicious use of resources", and in agriculture, the cultivation of plants or animals. Farmers and ranchers who raise livestock are considered to practice animal husbandry.

== History ==
=== Birth of husbandry ===
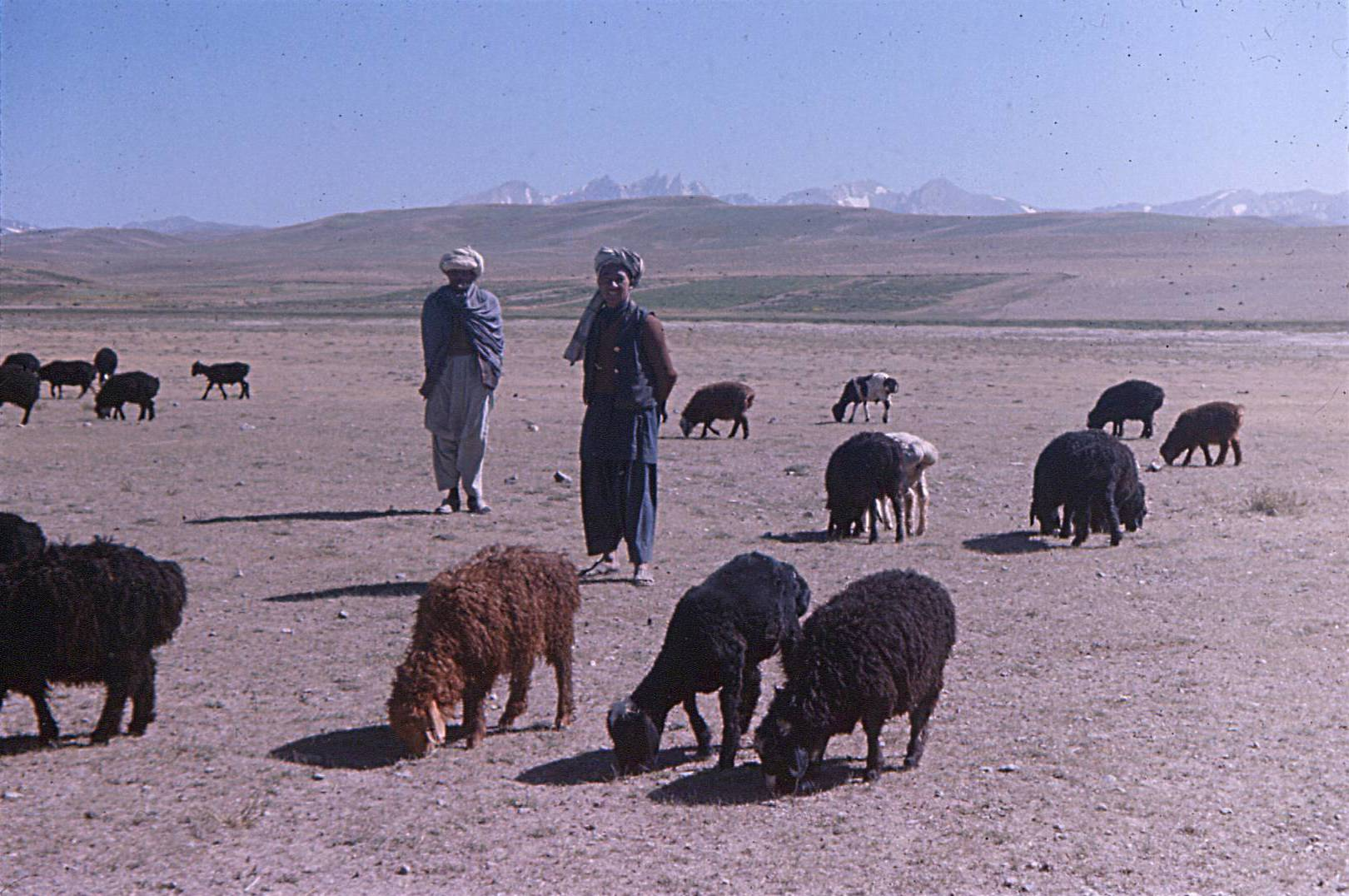
The domestication of ruminants, like these fat-tailed sheep in Afghanistan, provided nomads across the Middle East and central Asia with a reliable source of food.

The domestication of livestock was driven by the need to have food on hand when hunting was unproductive. The desirable characteristics of a domestic animal are that it should be useful to the domesticator, should be able to thrive in their company, should breed freely, and be easy to tend. Domestication was not a single event, but a process repeated at various periods in different places. Sheep and goats were the animals that accompanied the nomads in the Middle East, while cattle and pigs were associated with more settled communities. The first wild animal to be domesticated was the dog. Half-wild dogs, perhaps starting with young individuals, may have been tolerated as scavengers and killers of vermin, and, being naturally pack hunters, were predisposed to become part of the human pack and join in the hunt. Prey animals, sheep, goats, pigs, and cattle, were progressively domesticated early in the history of agriculture. Pigs were domesticated in the Near East between 8,500 and 8000 BC, sheep and goats in or near the Fertile Crescent about 8,500 BC, and cattle from wild aurochs in the areas of modern Turkey and Pakistan around 8,500 BC. A cow was a great advantage to a villager as she produced more milk than her calf needed, and her strength could be put to use as a working animal, pulling a plough to increase production of crops, and drawing a sledge, and later a cart, to bring the produce home from the field. Draught animals were first used about 4,000 BC in the Middle East, increasing agricultural production immeasurably.

In southern Asia, the elephant was domesticated by 6,000 BC. Fossilised chicken bones dated to 5040 BC have been found in northeastern China, far from where their wild ancestors lived in the jungles of tropical Asia, but archaeologists believe that the original purpose of domestication was for the sport of cockfighting. Meanwhile, in South America, the llama and the alpaca had been domesticated, probably before 3,000 BC, as beasts of burden and for their wool. Neither was strong enough to pull a plough, which limited the development of agriculture in the New World. Horses occur naturally on the steppes of Central Asia, and their domestication began around 3,000 BC in the Black Sea and Caspian Sea region. Although horses were originally seen as a source of meat, their use as pack animals and for riding followed. Around the same time, the wild ass was being tamed in Egypt. Camels were domesticated soon after this, with the Bactrian camel in Mongolia and the Arabian camel becoming beasts of burden. By 1000 BC, caravans of Arabian camels were linking India with Mesopotamia and the Mediterranean.

=== Ancient civilisations ===
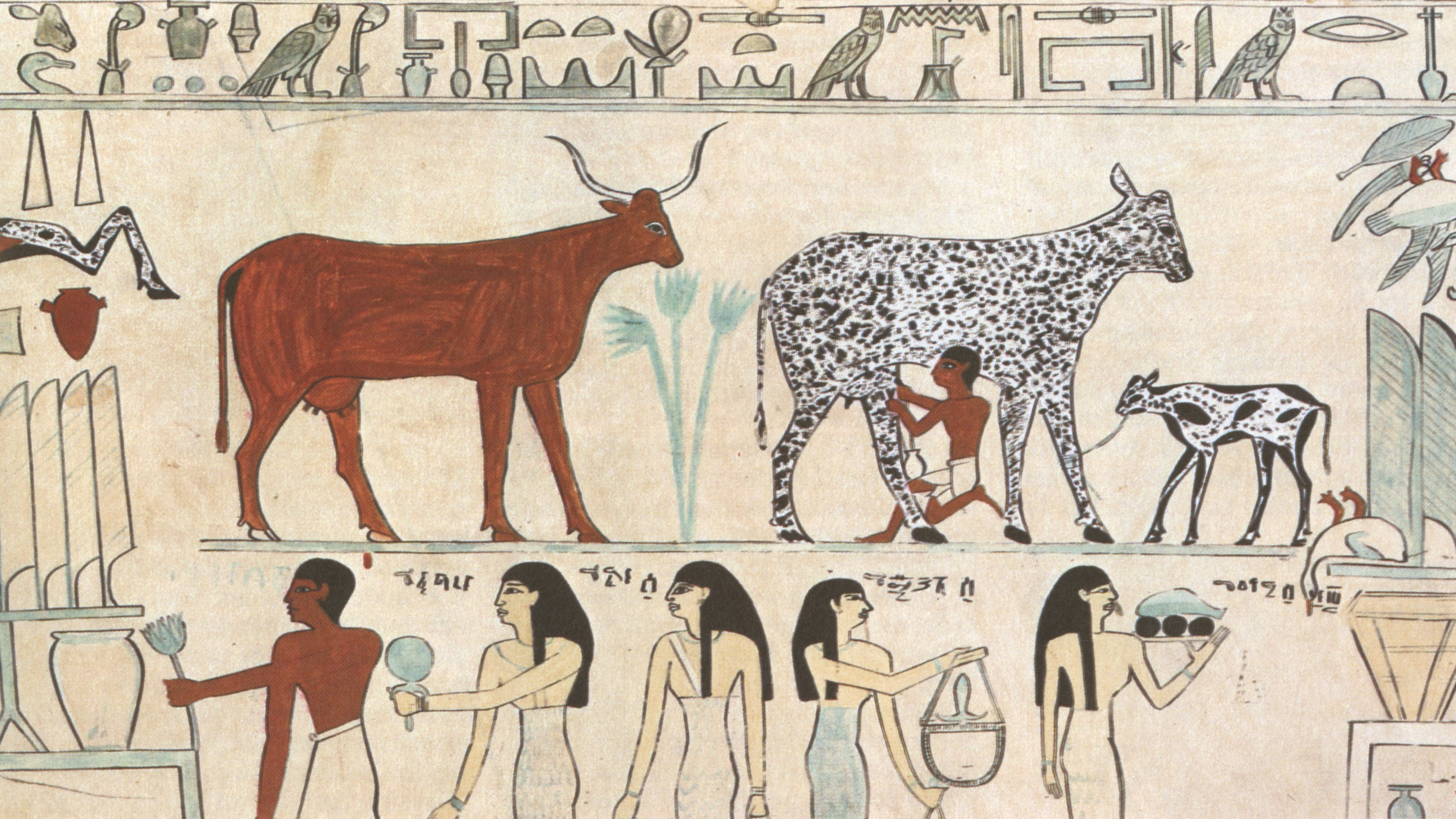
Milking cattle in ancient Egypt

In ancient Egypt, cattle were the most important livestock, and sheep, goats, and pigs were also kept; poultry including ducks, geese, and pigeons were captured in nets and bred on farms, where they were force-fed with dough to fatten them. The Nile provided a plentiful source of fish. Honey bees were domesticated from at least the Old Kingdom, providing both honey and wax. In ancient Rome, all the livestock known in ancient Egypt were available. In addition, rabbits were domesticated for food by the first century BC. To help flush them out from their burrows, the polecat was domesticated as the ferret, its use described by Pliny the Elder.

=== Medieval husbandry ===
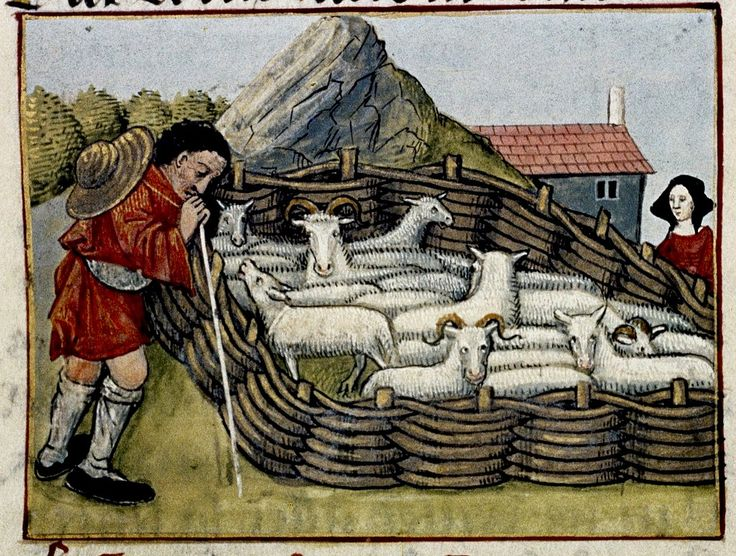
Shepherd with sheep in woven hurdle pen. Medieval France. 15th century, Bodleian Library, MS Douce 195

In northern Europe, agriculture, including animal husbandry, declined after the collapse of the Roman Empire. Some aspects, such as the herding of animals, continued throughout the period. By the 11th century, the economy had recovered, and the countryside was again productive. The Domesday Book recorded every parcel of land and every animal in England: "there was not one single hide, nor a yard of land, nay, moreover ... not even an ox, nor a cow, nor a swine was there left, that was not set down in [the king's] writ." For example, the royal manor of Earley in Berkshire, one of thousands of villages recorded in the book, had in 1086 "2 fisheries worth [paying tax of] 7s and 6d [each year] and 20 acres of meadow [for livestock]. Woodland for [feeding] 70 pigs." The improvements of animal husbandry in the medieval period in Europe went hand in hand with other developments. Improvements to the plough allowed the soil to be tilled to a greater depth. Horses took over from oxen as the main providers of traction, new ideas on crop rotation were developed, and the growing of crops for winter fodder gained ground. Peas, beans, and vetches became common; they increased soil fertility through nitrogen fixation, allowing more livestock to be kept.

=== Columbian exchange ===
The exploration and colonisation of North and South America resulted in the introduction of crops such as maize, potatoes, sweet potatoes, and manioc into Europe. At the same time, the principal Old World livestock – cattle, horses, sheep, and goats – were introduced into the New World for the first time along with wheat, barley, rice, and turnips.

In addition, the philosophies and practices of European animal husbandry were introduced to the Americas. Animal and insect cultivation had been practiced in Mesoamerica and the Caribbean before European contact: for example, turkeys, dogs, cochineal, and honeybees were raised for food, economic, and religious purposes. However, the cultural mode of interaction between humans and animals was very different: where Europeans viewed animals as resources fit for any human use, indigenous Mesoamericans hunted untamed animals for food while tamed animals (iegue or tlatlacacihuitilli) were to be cherished.

This cultural difference led to indigenous resistance to European animal husbandry, a primary example being the treatment of chickens as iegue or pets rather than livestock. Old World animal husbandry practices eventually became further integrated into New World society when the encomienda system compelled indigenous labourers to participate.

=== Agricultural Revolution ===
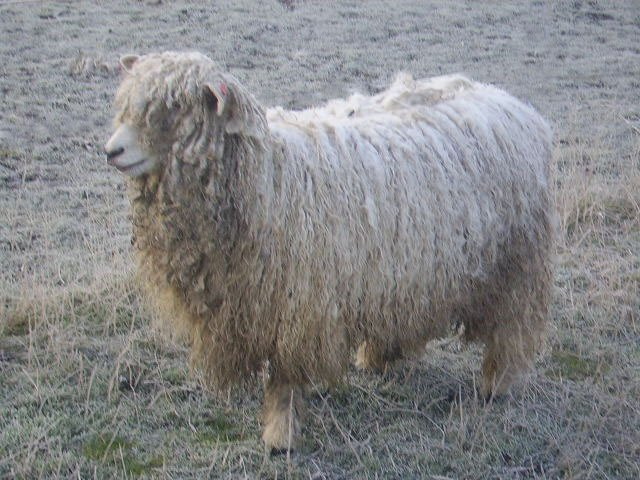
The Lincoln Longwool breed was improved by Robert Bakewell in the 18th century.

Selective breeding for desired traits was established as a scientific practice by Robert Bakewell during the British Agricultural Revolution in the 18th century. One of his most important breeding programs was with sheep. Using native stock, he was able to quickly select for large, yet fine-boned sheep, with long, lustrous wool. The Lincoln Longwool was improved by Bakewell, and, in turn, the Lincoln was used to develop the subsequent breed, the New (or Dishley) Leicester. It was hornless and had a square, meaty body with straight top lines. These sheep were exported widely and have contributed to numerous modern breeds. Under his influence, English farmers began to breed cattle primarily for beef. Long-horned heifers were crossed with the Westmoreland bull to create the Dishley Longhorn.

The semi-natural, unfertilised pastures formed by traditional agricultural methods in Europe were managed by grazing and mowing. As the ecological impact of this land management strategy is similar to that of natural disturbances such as grazing and wildfire, this agricultural system shares many beneficial characteristics with a natural habitat, including promoting biodiversity. This strategy is declining in Europe today due to intensified agriculture. The mechanized and chemical methods used are causing biodiversity to decline.

== Practices ==
=== Systems ===
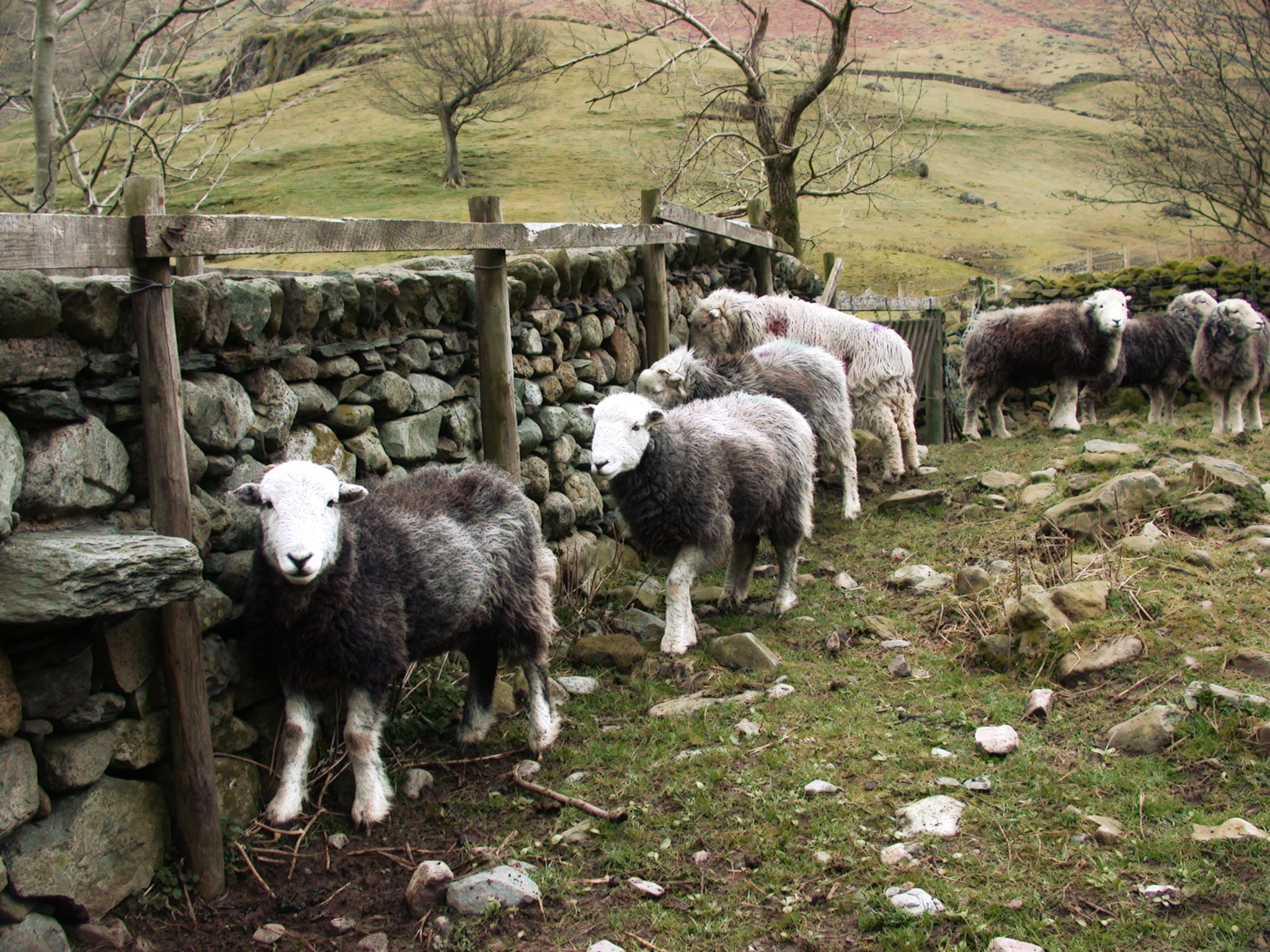
Herdwick sheep in an extensive hill farming system, Lake District, England

Traditionally, animal husbandry was part of the subsistence farmer's way of life, producing not only the food needed by the family but also the fuel, fertiliser, clothing, transport, and draught power. Killing the animal for food was a secondary consideration; wherever possible its products such as wool, eggs, milk and blood (by the Maasai) were harvested while the animal was still alive. In the traditional system of transhumance, people and livestock moved seasonally between fixed summer and winter pastures; in montane regions the summer pasture was up in the mountains, the winter pasture in the valleys.

Animals can be kept extensively or intensively. Extensive systems involve animals roaming at will, or under the supervision of a herdsman, often for their protection from predators. Ranching in the Western United States involves large herds of cattle grazing widely over public and private lands. Similar cattle stations are found in South America, Australia, and other places with large areas of land and low rainfall. Ranching systems have been used for sheep, deer, ostrich, emu, llama and alpaca.

In the uplands of the United Kingdom, sheep are turned out on the fells in spring and graze the abundant mountain grasses untended, being brought to lower altitudes late in the year, with supplementary feeding being provided in winter. In rural locations, pigs and poultry can obtain much of their nutrition from scavenging, and in African communities, hens may live for months without being fed, and still produce one or two eggs a week.

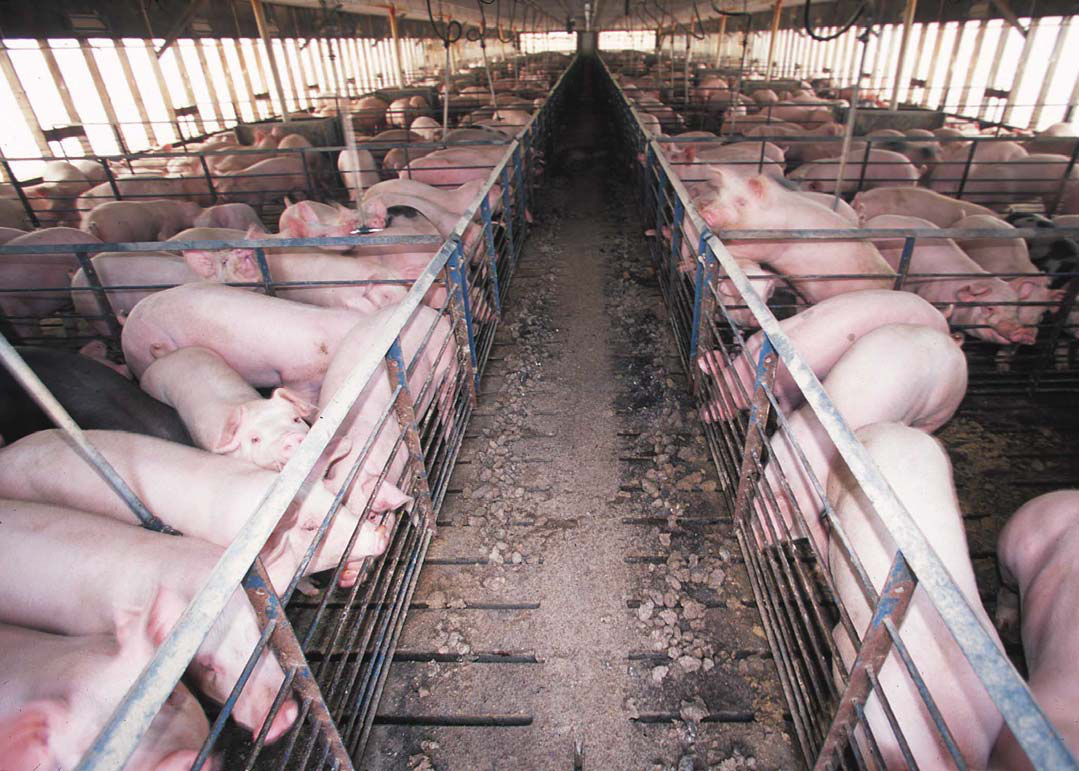
Pigs in an intensive system, Midwestern United States

At the other extreme, in the more developed parts of the world, animals are often intensively managed; dairy cows may be kept in zero-grazing conditions with all their forage brought to them; beef cattle may be kept in high density feedlots; pigs may be housed in climate-controlled buildings and never go outdoors; poultry may be reared in barns and kept in cages as laying birds under lighting-controlled conditions. In between these two extremes are semi-intensive, often family-run farms where livestock graze outside for much of the year, silage or hay is made to cover the times of year when the grass stops growing, and fertiliser, feed, and other inputs are brought onto the farm from outside.

=== Feeding ===
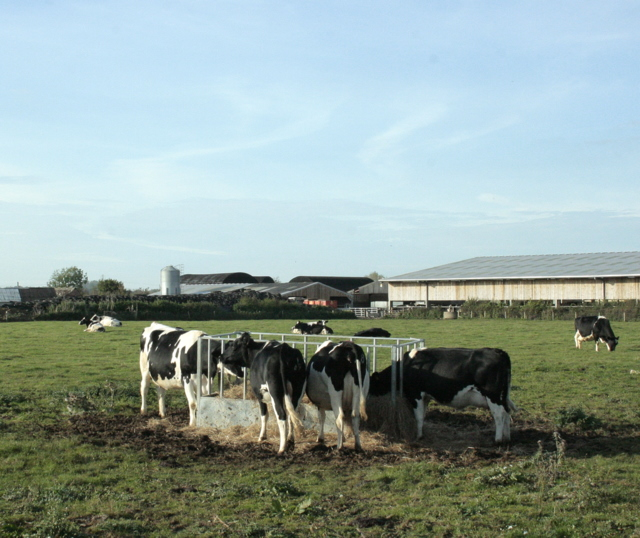
Cattle around an outdoor feeder

Animals used as livestock are predominantly herbivorous, the main exceptions being the pig and the chicken, which are omnivorous. Herbivores can be divided into "concentrate selectors", which selectively feed on seeds, fruits, and highly nutritious young foliage; "grazers", which mainly feed on grass; and "intermediate feeders", which choose their diet from the full range of available plant material. Cattle, sheep, goats, deer, and antelopes are ruminants; they digest food in two steps, chewing and swallowing in the normal way, and then regurgitating the semidigested cud to chew it again and thus extract the maximum possible food value. The dietary needs of these animals are mostly met by eating grass. Grasses grow from the base of the leaf-blade, enabling it to thrive even when heavily grazed or cut.

In many climates, grass growth is seasonal, for example, in the temperate summer or tropical rainy season, so some areas of the crop are set aside to be cut and preserved, either as hay (dried grass), or as silage (fermented grass). Other forage crops are also grown and many of these, as well as crop residues, can be ensiled to fill the gap in the nutritional needs of livestock in the lean season.

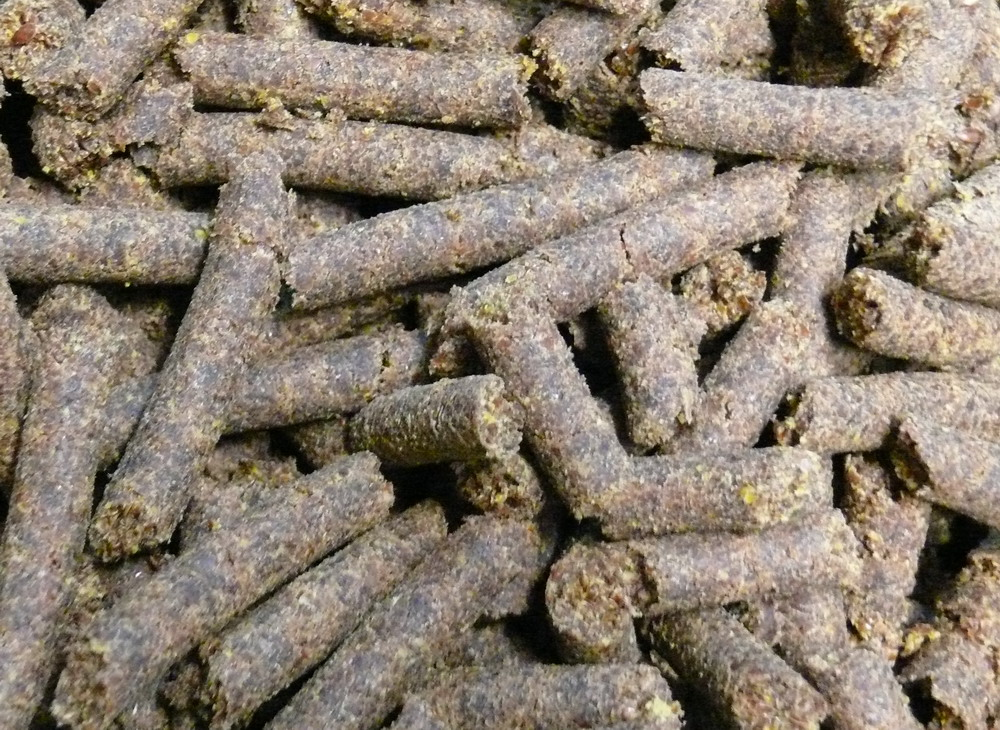
Cattle feed pellets of pressed linseed

Extensively reared animals may subsist entirely on forage, but more intensively kept livestock will require energy and protein-rich foods in addition. Energy is mainly derived from cereals and cereal by-products, fats and oils, and sugar-rich foods, while protein may come from fish or meat meal, milk products, legumes, and other plant foods, often the by-products of vegetable oil extraction. Pigs and poultry are non-ruminants and are unable to digest the cellulose in grass and other forages, so they are fed entirely on cereals and other high-energy foodstuffs. The ingredients for the animals' rations can be grown on the farm or bought as pelleted or cubed compound foodstuffs, specially formulated for different classes of livestock, their growth stages, and their specific nutritional requirements. Vitamins and minerals are added to balance the diet. Farmed fish are usually fed pelleted food.

=== Breeding ===
The breeding of farm animals seldom occurs spontaneously but is managed by farmers to encourage traits considered desirable. These include hardiness, fertility, docility, mothering abilities, fast growth rates, low feed consumption per unit of growth, better body proportions, higher yields, and better fibre qualities. Undesirable traits such as health defects and aggressiveness are selected against.

Selective breeding has been responsible for significant productivity increases. For example, in 2007, a typical broiler chicken at eight weeks old was 4.8 times as heavy as a bird of similar age in 1957, while in the thirty years to 2007, the average milk yield of a dairy cow in the United States nearly doubled.

=== Animal health ===
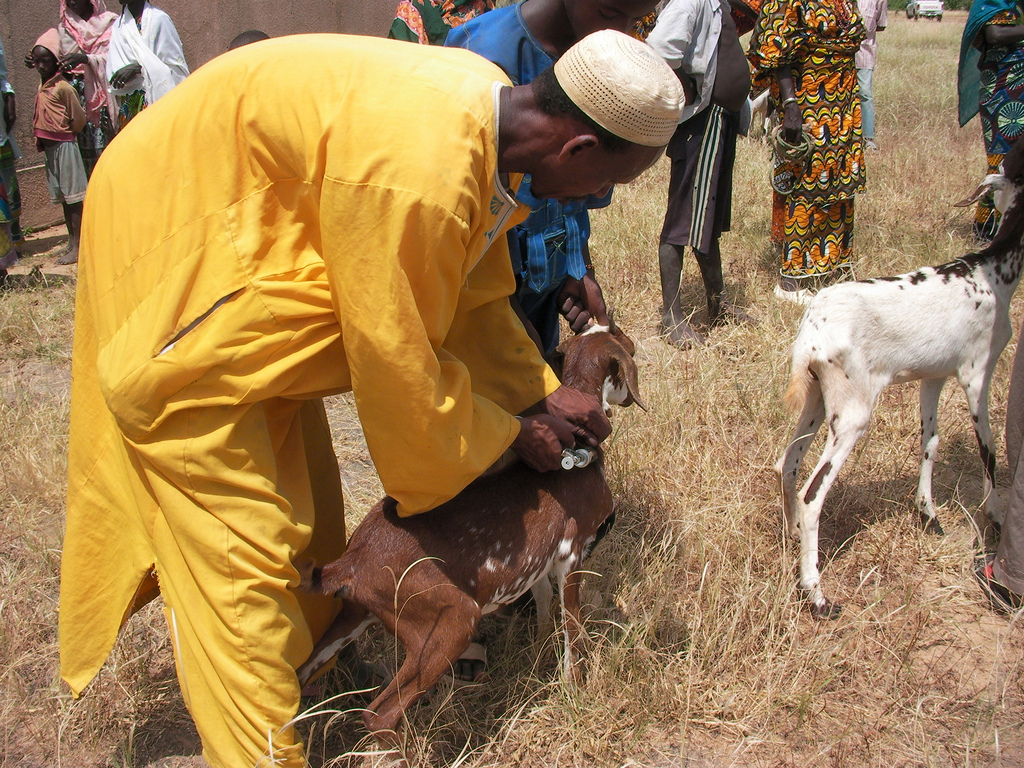
Vaccinating a goat, Niger

Good husbandry, proper feeding, and hygiene are the main contributors to animal health on the farm, bringing economic benefits through maximised production. When, despite these precautions, animals still become sick, they are treated with veterinary medicines, by the farmer and the veterinarian. In the European Union, when farmers treat their own animals, they are required to follow treatment guidelines and record the treatments given. Animals are susceptible to many diseases and conditions that may affect their health. Some, like classical swine fever and scrapie are specific to one type of stock, while others, like foot-and-mouth disease affect all cloven-hoofed animals. Animals living under intensive conditions are prone to internal and external parasites; increasing numbers of sea lice are affecting farmed salmon in Scotland. Reducing the parasite burdens of livestock results in increased productivity and profitability.

Where the condition is serious, governments impose regulations on imports and exports, the movement of stock, quarantine restrictions, and the reporting of suspected cases. Vaccines are available against certain diseases, and antibiotics are widely used where appropriate. At one time, antibiotics were routinely added to certain compound foodstuffs to promote growth. Still, this practice is now frowned on in many countries because of the risk that it may lead to antimicrobial resistance in livestock and in humans.

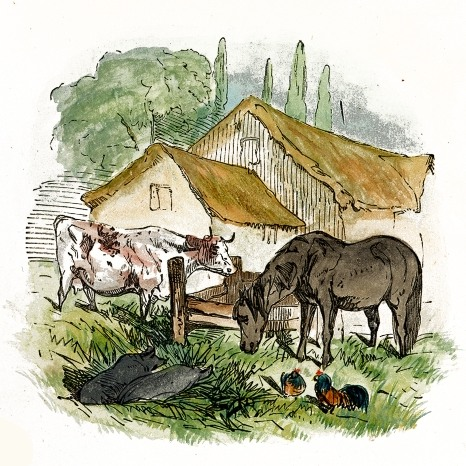
Familiar livestock: ink and watercolour drawing of a farmyard with cow, horse, pigs, and chickens, 1869

Governments are concerned with zoonoses, diseases that humans may acquire from animals. Wild animal populations may harbour diseases that can affect domestic animals, which may acquire them as a result of insufficient biosecurity. An outbreak of Nipah virus in Malaysia in 1999 was traced back to pigs becoming ill after contact with fruit-eating flying foxes, their faeces and urine. The pigs, in turn, passed the infection to humans. Avian flu H5N1 is present in wild bird populations and can be carried large distances by migrating birds. This virus is easily transmissible to domestic poultry and to humans living in proximity to them. Other infectious diseases affecting wild animals, farm animals and humans include rabies, leptospirosis, brucellosis, tuberculosis and trichinosis.

=== Range of species ===
There is no single universally agreed-upon definition of what species are considered livestock. Widely recognized livestock types include cattle for beef and dairy, sheep, goats, pigs, and poultry. Various other species are sometimes considered livestock, such as horses, while poultry birds are sometimes excluded. In some parts of the world, livestock includes species such as buffalo, and the South American camelids, the alpaca and llama. Some authorities use much broader definitions to include fish in aquaculture, micro-livestock such as rabbits and rodents like guinea pigs, as well as insects from honey bees to crickets raised for human consumption.

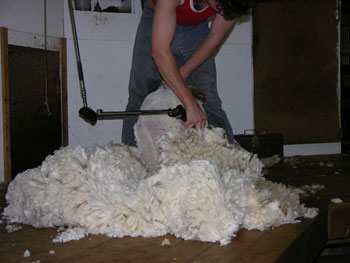
Shearing a Merino sheep for its wool

== Products ==
Animals are raised for a wide variety of products, principally meat, wool, milk, and eggs, but also including tallow, isinglass, and rennet. Animals are also kept for more specialised purposes, such as to produce vaccines and antiserum (containing antibodies) for medical use. Where fodder or other crops are grown alongside animals, manure can serve as a fertiliser, returning minerals and organic matter to the soil in a semi-closed organic system.

== Branches ==
=== Dairy ===
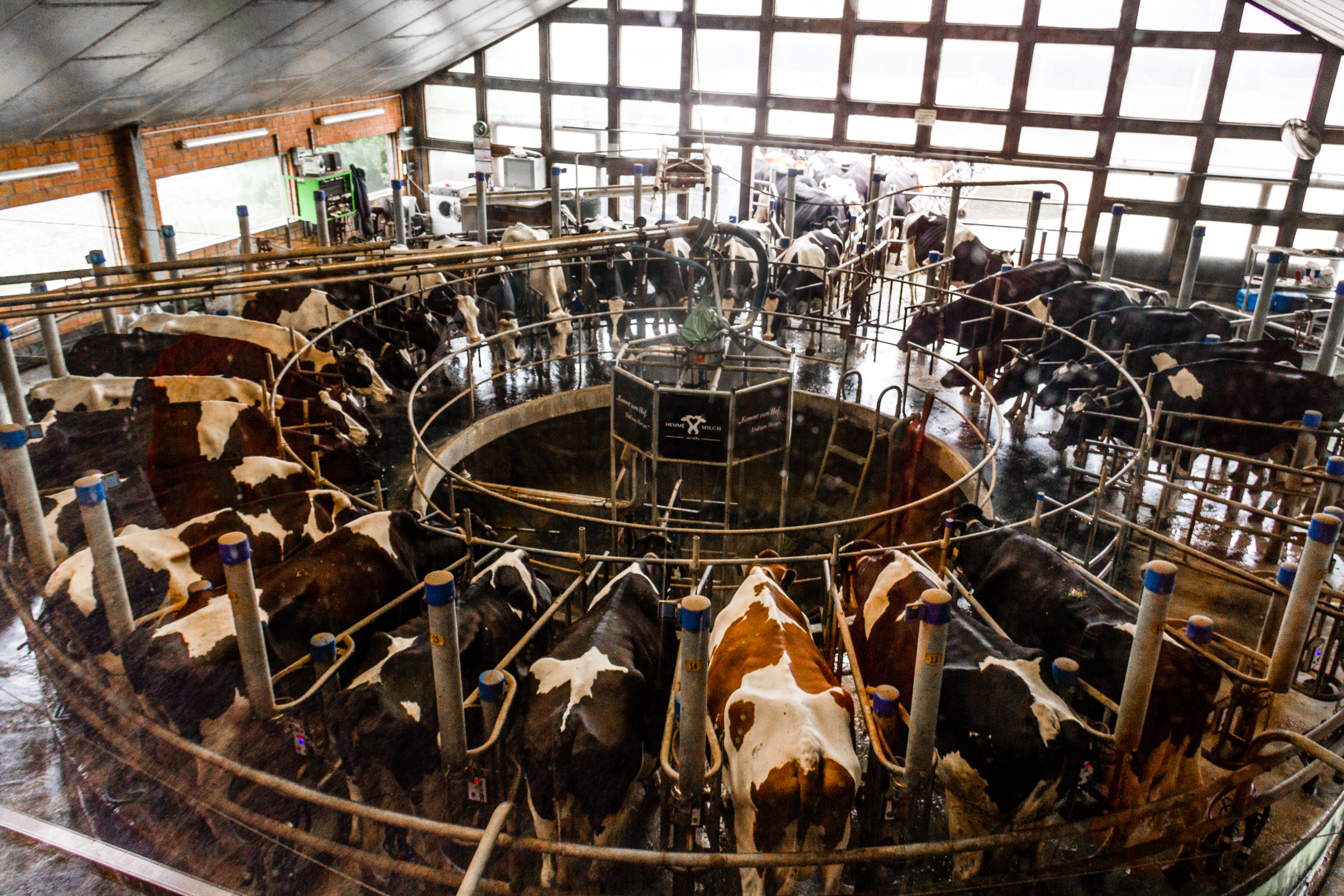
A modern rotary milking parlour, Germany

Although all mammals produce milk to nourish their young, cows are predominantly used worldwide to produce milk and milk products for human consumption. Other animals used to a lesser extent for this purpose include sheep, goats, camels, buffaloes, yaks, reindeer, horses, and donkeys.

All these animals have been domesticated over the centuries, bred for desirable characteristics such as fecundity, productivity, docility, and the ability to thrive under prevailing conditions. Whereas in the past cattle had multiple functions, modern dairy cow breeding has produced specialised Holstein Friesian-type animals that produce large quantities of milk economically. Artificial insemination is widely available, allowing farmers to select for traits that suit their circumstances.

Whereas in the past cows were kept in small herds on family farms, grazing pastures and being fed hay in winter, nowadays there is a trend towards larger herds, more intensive systems, the feeding of silage and "zero grazing", a system where grass is cut and brought to the cow, which is housed year-round.

In many communities, milk production is only part of the purpose of keeping an animal, which may also be used as a beast of burden or to draw a plough, or for the production of fibre, meat and leather, with the dung being used for fuel or for the improvement of soil fertility. Sheep and goats may be favoured for dairy production in climates and conditions that do not suit dairy cows.

=== Meat ===
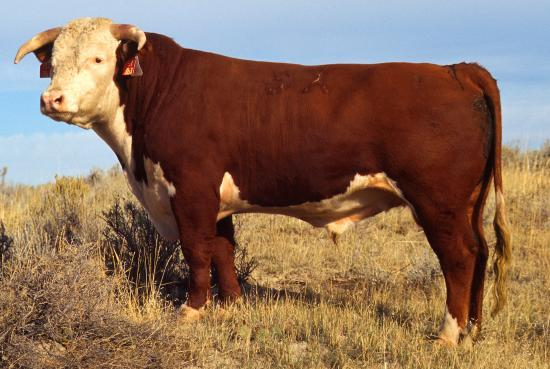
The Hereford is a hardy breed of beef cattle, now raised in many countries around the world.

Meat, mainly from farmed animals, is a major source of dietary protein and essential nutrients around the world, averaging about 8% of human energy intake. The actual types eaten depend on local preferences, availability, cost, and other factors, with cattle, sheep, pigs, and goats being the main species involved. Cattle generally produce a single offspring annually which takes more than a year to mature; sheep and goats often have twins and these are ready for slaughter in less than a year; pigs are more prolific, producing more than one litter of up to about 11 piglets each year. Horses, donkeys, deer, buffalo, llamas, alpacas, guanacos and vicunas are farmed for meat in various regions. Some desirable traits of animals raised for meat include fecundity, hardiness, fast growth rate, ease of management, and high food conversion efficiency. About half of the world's meat is produced from animals grazing on open ranges or enclosed pastures; the other half is produced intensively in various factory-farming systems. These are mostly cows, pigs, or poultry, and are often reared indoors at high densities.

=== Poultry ===
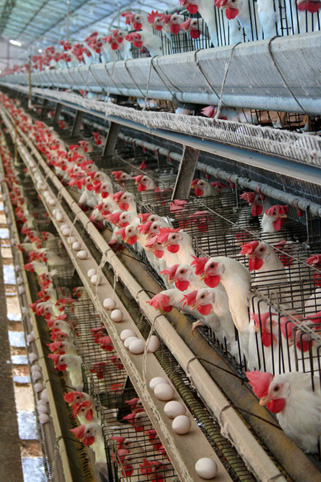
Battery hens, Brazil

Poultry kept for their eggs and meat include chickens, turkeys, geese, and ducks. The great majority of laying birds used for egg production are chickens. Methods for keeping layers range from free-range systems, where the birds can roam as they will but are housed at night for their own protection, through semi-intensive systems, where they are housed in barns with perches, litter, and some freedom of movement, to intensive systems, where they are kept in cages. The battery cages are arranged in long rows across multiple tiers, with external feeders, drinkers, and egg-collection facilities. This is the most labour-saving and economical method of egg production. Still, it has been criticised on animal-welfare grounds because the birds are unable to exhibit their normal behaviours.

In the developed world, the majority of poultry reared for meat is raised indoors in large sheds, with automated equipment and environmentally controlled conditions. Chickens raised in this way are known as broilers, and genetic improvements have enabled them to reach slaughter weight within six or seven weeks of hatching. Newly hatched chicks are confined to a small area and provided with supplementary heating. Litter on the floor absorbs droppings, and the area it occupies expands as they grow. Feed and water are supplied automatically, and the lighting is controlled. The birds may be harvested on several occasions, or the entire shed may be cleared at once.

A similar rearing system is usually used for turkeys, which are less hardy than chickens, take longer to reach maturity, and are often moved to separate fattening units to finish. Ducks are particularly popular in Asia and Australia and can be killed at seven weeks under commercial conditions.

=== Aquaculture ===
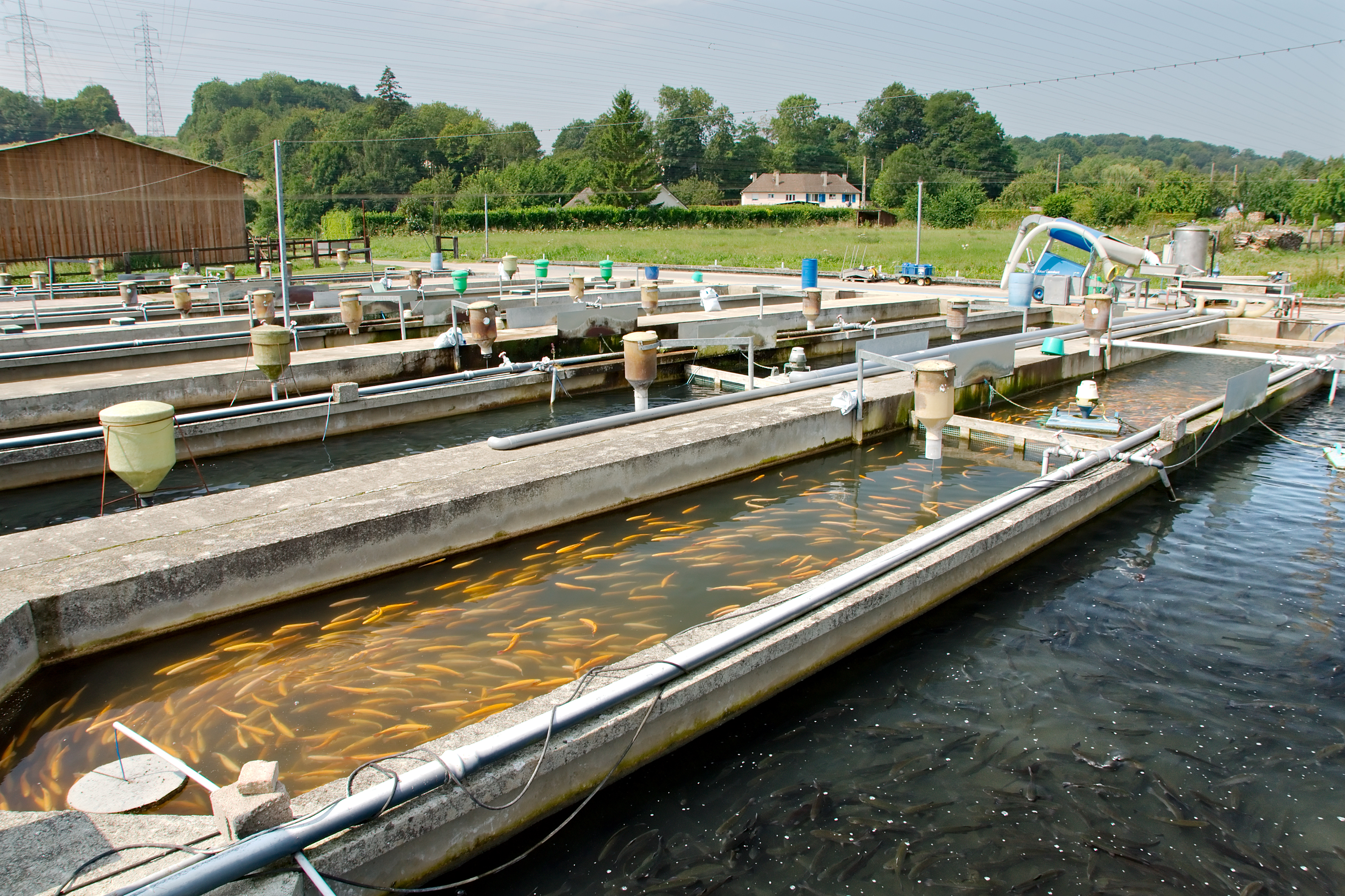
Freshwater fish farming, France

Aquaculture has been defined as "the farming of aquatic organisms, including fish, molluscs, crustaceans, and aquatic plants, and implies some form of intervention in the rearing process to enhance production, such as regular stocking, feeding, protection from predators, etc. Farming also implies individual or corporate ownership of the stock being cultivated." In practice, it can take place in the sea or in freshwater, and be extensive or intensive. Whole bays, lakes, or ponds may be devoted to aquaculture, or the farmed animal may be retained in cages (fish), artificial reefs, racks, or strings (shellfish). Fish and prawns can be cultivated in rice paddies, either arriving naturally or being introduced, and both crops can be harvested together.

Fish hatcheries provide larval and juvenile fish, crustaceans, and shellfish for use in aquaculture systems. When large enough, these are transferred to growing-on tanks and sold to fish farms for harvest. Some species that are commonly raised in hatcheries include shrimps, prawns, salmon, tilapia, oysters and scallops. Similar facilities can be used to raise species with conservation needs for release into the wild, or game fish for restocking waterways. Important aspects of husbandry at these early stages include selection of breeding stock, control of water quality, and nutrition. In the wild, there is a high mortality rate at the nursery stage; farmers seek to minimise it while maximising growth rates.

=== Insects ===
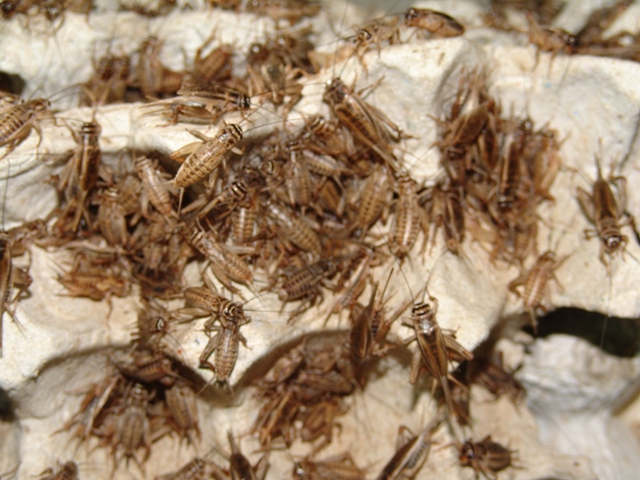
Crickets being raised for human consumption, Thailand

Bees have been kept in hives since at least the First Dynasty of Egypt, five thousand years ago, and man had been harvesting honey from the wild long before that. Fixed-comb hives are used in many parts of the world and are made from locally available materials. In more advanced economies, where modern strains of domestic bee have been selected for docility and productiveness, various designs of hive are used which enable the combs to be removed for processing and extraction of honey. Quite apart from the honey and wax they produce, honey bees are important pollinators of crops and wild plants, and in many places hives are transported around the countryside to assist in pollination.

Sericulture, the rearing of silkworms, was first adopted by the Chinese during the Shang dynasty. The only species farmed commercially is the domesticated silkmoth. When it spins its cocoon, each larva produces an exceedingly long, slender thread of silk. The larvae feed on mulberry leaves, and in Europe, only one generation is typically raised each year because mulberry is a deciduous tree. In China, Korea, and Japan, however, two generations are normal, and in the tropics, multiple generations are expected. Most silk production occurs in the Far East, with synthetic diets used to rear silkworms in Japan.

Insects form part of the human diet in many cultures. In Thailand, crickets are farmed for this purpose in the north of the country, and palm weevil larvae in the south. The crickets are kept in pens, boxes, or drawers and fed on commercial pelleted poultry food, while the palm weevil larvae live on cabbage palm and sago palm trees, which limits their production to areas where these trees grow. Another delicacy of this region is the bamboo caterpillar, and the best rearing and harvesting techniques in semi-natural habitats are being studied.

== Effects ==
=== Environmental impact ===
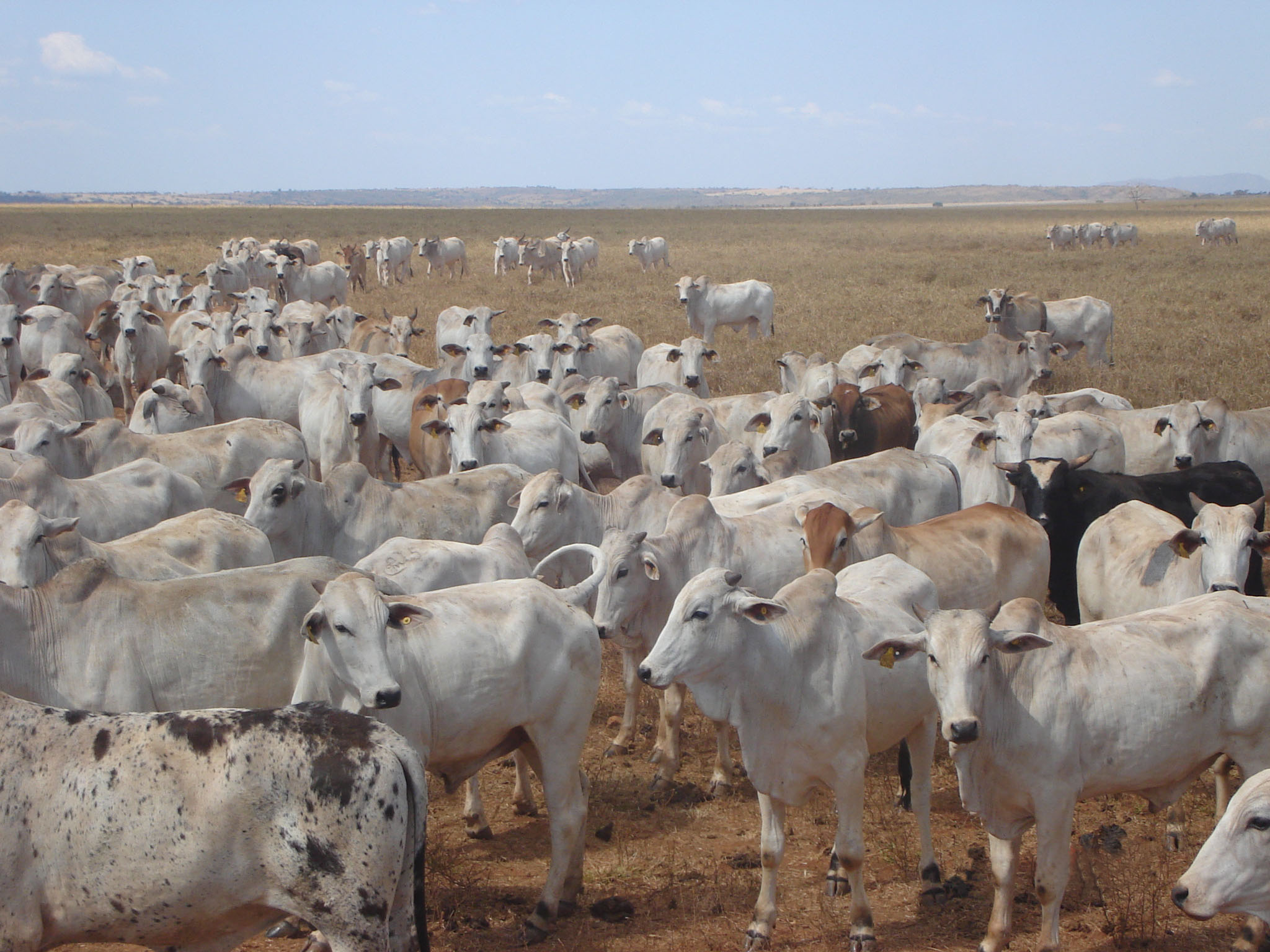
Livestock production requires large areas of land.

Animal husbandry has a significant impact on the world environment. Both production and consumption of animal products have increased rapidly. Since 1950, meat production has tripled, dairy production has doubled, and egg production has increased almost fourfold. Meanwhile, meat consumption has nearly doubled worldwide. Developing countries had a surge in meat consumption, particularly of monogastric livestock. Animal husbandry drives climate change, ocean acidification, and biodiversity loss, and kills 60 billion animals annually. It uses between 20 and 33% of the world's fresh water, Livestock, and the production of feed for them, occupy about a third of the Earth's ice-free land. Livestock production contributes to species extinction, desertification, and habitat destruction. and is the primary driver of the Holocene extinction. Some 70% of the agricultural land and 30% of Earth's land surface is involved directly or indirectly in animal husbandry. Habitat is destroyed by clearing forests and converting land to grow feed crops and for grazing, while predators and herbivores are frequently targeted because of a perceived threat to livestock profits; for example, animal husbandry causes up to 91% of the deforestation in the Amazon region. In addition, livestock produce greenhouse gases. Cows produce some 570 million cubic metres of methane per day, that accounts for 35 to 40% of the overall methane emissions of the planet. Further, livestock production is responsible for 65% of all human-related emissions of nitrous oxide.

=== Animal welfare ===
Since the 18th century, people have become increasingly concerned about the welfare of farm animals. Possible measures of welfare include longevity, behavior, physiology, reproduction, freedom from disease, and freedom from immunosuppression. Standards and laws for animal welfare have been created worldwide, broadly in line with the most widely held position in the western world, a form of utilitarianism: that it is morally acceptable for humans to use non-human animals, provided that no unnecessary suffering is caused, and that the benefits to humans outweigh the costs to the livestock. An opposing view is that animals have rights, should not be regarded as property, are not necessary to use, and should never be used by humans. Live export of animals has risen to meet increased global demand for livestock, such as in the Middle East. Animal rights activists have objected to the long-distance transport of animals; one result was the banning of live exports from New Zealand in 2003.

== In culture ==
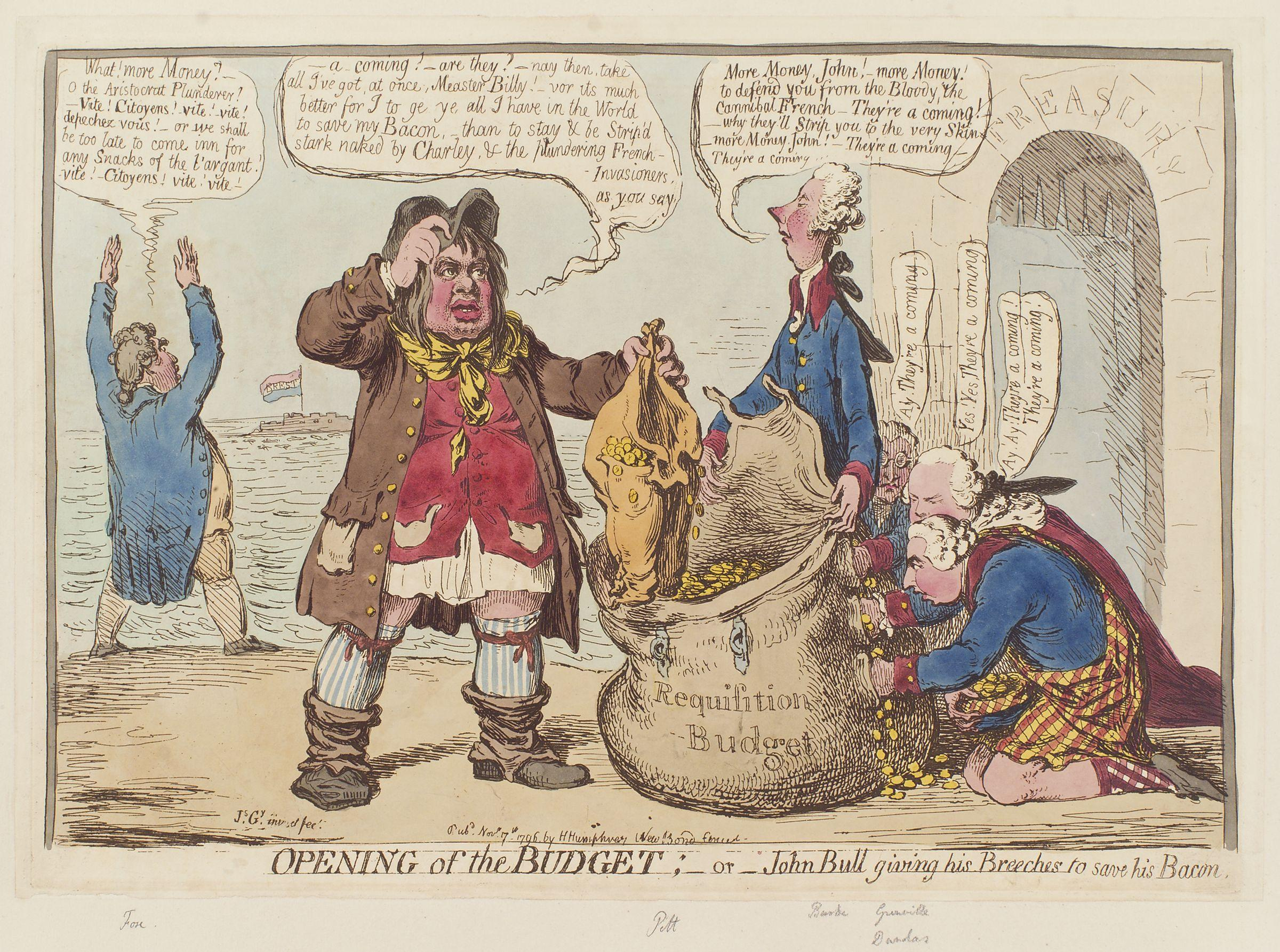
Opening of the budget; – or – John Bull giving his breeches to save his bacon (Note: Both the name Bull and the reference to bacon indicate the archetypal livestock farmer.) by James Gillray (d. 1815)

Since the 18th century, the farmer John Bull has represented English national identity, first in John Arbuthnot's political satires, and soon afterwards in cartoons by James Gillray and others, including John Tenniel. He likes food, beer, dogs, horses, and country sports; he is practical, down-to-earth, and anti-intellectual.

Farm animals are widespread in children's books and songs; the reality of animal husbandry is often distorted, softened, or idealized, giving children an almost entirely fictitious account of farm life. The books often depict happy animals free to roam in attractive countryside, a picture completely at odds with the realities of the impersonal, mechanized activities involved in modern intensive farming.

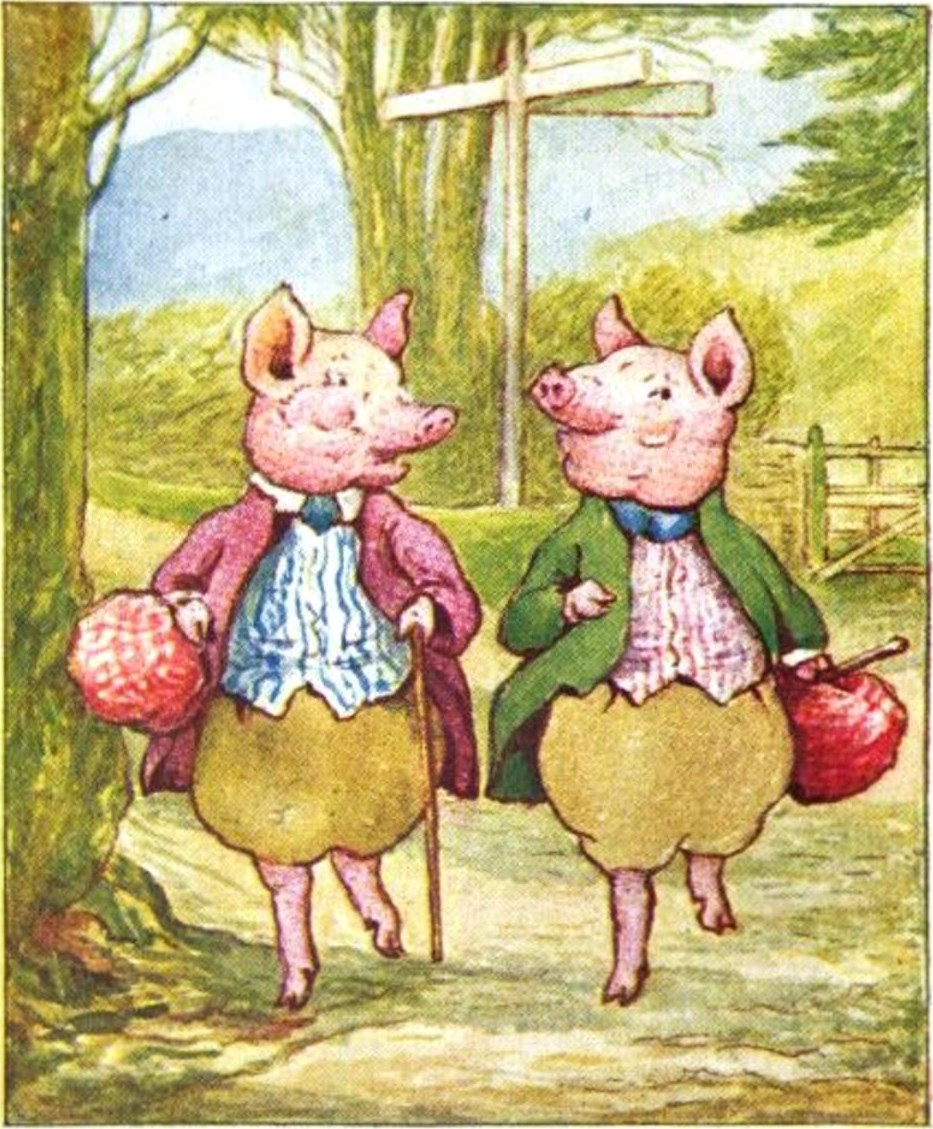
Dressed pigs in Beatrix Potter's 1913 The Tale of Pigling Bland

Pigs, for example, appear in several of Beatrix Potter's "little books", as Piglet in A.A. Milne's Winnie the Pooh stories, and somewhat more darkly (with a hint of animals going to slaughter) as Babe in Dick King-Smith's The Sheep-Pig, and as Wilbur in E. B. White's Charlotte's Web. Pigs tend to be "bearers of cheerfulness, good humour and innocence". Many of these books are completely anthropomorphic, dressing farm animals in clothes and having them walk on two legs, live in houses, and perform human activities. The children's song "Old MacDonald Had a Farm" describes a farmer named MacDonald and the various animals he keeps, celebrating the noises they each make.

Many urban children experience animal husbandry for the first time at a petting farm; in Britain, some five million people a year visit a farm of some kind. This presents some risk of infection, especially if children handle animals and then fail to wash their hands; a strain of E. coli infected 93 people who had visited a British interactive farm in an outbreak in 2009. Historic farms such as those in the United States offer farmstays and "a carefully curated version of farming to those willing to pay for it", sometimes giving visitors a romanticised image of a pastoral idyll from an unspecified time in the pre-industrial past.

== See also ==
- Agribusiness
- Fishery
- Food vs. feed
- Industrial agriculture
- Wildlife farming
- Zootechnics
