= Maxilla (arthropod mouthpart) =

One of two pairs of structures on arthropod heads

In this malacostracan crustacean diagram, the maxillae are labelled maxilla and maxillula.

In arthropods, the maxillae (singular maxilla) are paired structures present on the head as mouthparts in members of the clade Mandibulata, used for tasting and manipulating food. Embryologically, the maxillae are derived from the 4th and 5th segment of the head and the maxillary palps; segmented appendages extending from the base of the maxilla represent the former leg of those respective segments. In most cases, two pairs of maxillae are present and in different arthropod groups the two pairs of maxillae have been variously modified. In crustaceans, the first pair are called maxillulae (singular maxillula).

Modified coxae at the base of the pedipalps in spiders are also called "maxillae", although they are not homologous with mandibulate maxillae.

== Myriapoda ==
=== Millipedes ===
In millipedes, the second maxillae have been lost, reducing the mouthparts to only the first maxillae which have fused together to form a gnathochilarium, acting as a lower lip to the buccal cavity and the mandibles which have been enlarged and specialized greatly, used for chewing food. The gnathochilarium is richly infused with chemosensory and tactile receptors along its edge. A pair of maxillary glands, also called nephridial organs, involved in osmoregulation and excreting nitrogenous waste open up to the gnathochilarium and wastes are passed entirely through the digestive tract before being evacuated. The nephridial organs are thought to be derived from similar organs in annelids, although reduced in number since the open circulatory system of arthropods lessens the demand on separate excretory organs. The reason for their anterior location is probably because these organs must be developed early on in the embryo and millipedes and other arthropods develop mainly by proliferation of cells at the posterior of the embryo.

=== Centipedes ===
A diagram of the anatomy of the maxillae in centipedes

In centipedes, both pairs of maxillae are developed. The first maxillae are situated ventrally to the mandibles and obscure them from view. This pair consists of a basal plate formed from the fused coxae of each leg plus ventral sternite from this segment and is hence called a coxosternite and two pairs of conically jointed appendages called telopodites and coxal projections. The second maxillae, which partly cover the first maxillae, consist of only a telopodite and a coxosternite. The telopodite is recognizably leglike in structure and consists of three segments plus an apical claw. The second maxillae also have a metameric pore, which is the opening of the maxillary gland and maxillary nephridium homologous to those of millipedes.

== Crustaceans ==
In crustaceans, the two pairs of maxillae are called maxillulae (1st pair) and maxillae (2nd pair). They serve to transport food to the mandibles but also frequently help in the filtration process and additionally they may sometimes play a role in cleaning and grooming. These structures show an incredible diversity throughout crustaceans but generally are very much flattened and leaf-like. The two pairs are normally positioned very close together and their apical parts generally are in direct contact with the mandible.

== Hexapoda ==
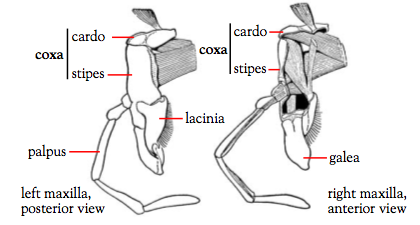
Diagram of a single maxilla from the cockroach Periplaneta americana showing the anatomy and musculature

The generalized condition in hexapods is for the first pair of maxillae to consist of a basal triangular sclerite called the cardo and a large central sclerite called the stipes from which arise three processes: the lacinia, the galea and the maxillary palp. The lacinia is often strongly sclerotized and toothed. It functions to cut and manipulate food in the mouth. The galea is a broad, scoop-like, lobe structure, which assists the maxillary palps in sampling items before ingestion. The maxillary palp is serially homologous to the walking leg while the cardo and stipes are regarded by most to be serially homologous to the first leg segment, the coxa. The labium is immediately posterior to the first maxillae and is formed from the fusion of the second maxillae, although in lower orders including the Archaeognatha (bristletails) and Zygentoma (silverfish) the two maxillae are not completely fused. It consists of a basal submentum, which connects with the prementum through a narrow sclerite, the mentum. The labium forms the lower portion of the buccal cavity in insects. The prementum has a pair of labial palps laterally, and two broad soft lobes called the paraglossae medially. These paraglossae have two small slender lobes called glossae at their base.

=== Specializations ===
In many hexapods, the mouthparts have been modified for different functions and the maxillae and labium can change in structure greatly. In bees, the maxillae and labium have been modified and fused to form a nectar-sucking proboscis. In the order Hemiptera, the true bugs, plant hoppers, etc., the mouthparts have been modified to form a beak for piercing. The labium forms a sheath around a set of stylets that consist of an outer pair of mandibles and an inner pair of maxillae. In lapping flies, a proboscis is formed from mostly the labium specialized for lapping up liquids. The labial palps form a labella which have sclerotized bands for directing liquid to a hypopharangeal stylet, through which the fly can imbibe liquids. In lepidopterans, the fluid-sucking proboscis is formed entirely from the galea of the maxillae although labial palps are also present. In Odonata nymphs, the labium forms a mask-like extensible structure, which is used for reaching out and grasping prey.
