= Kangfuxin Ye =

Extract and formula used in Traditional Chinese medicine

Kangfuxin Ye (Chinese: 康复新液), also known as Rehabilitation New Liquid, is an extract and formula used in Traditional Chinese medicine, derived from the desiccated bodies of American cockroaches.

== Production ==
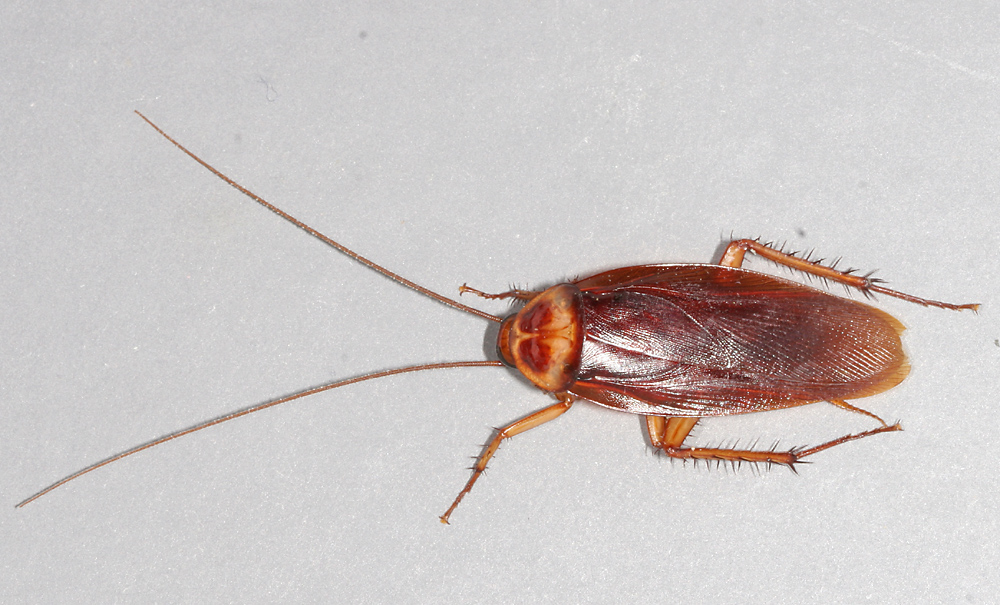
Periplaneta americana (American cockroach) – the favoured species for farming

The cockroach was originally documented in the Shennong Bencaojing (Chinese: 《神農本草經》) within the annals of Chinese traditional medicine, subsequently appearing in Mingyi Bielu (Chinese: 《名醫別錄》) the late Han Dynasty, as well as in the Ming Dynasty's esteemed Yi medicine dictionary, Qi Su Shu (Chinese: 齊甦書), along with numerous other herbal remedies.

In 1968, Li Shunan (Chinese: 李树楠), a Chinese pharmacist, identified the therapeutic properties of cockroaches through the traditional remedies of the Bai people. Since 1978, Professor Li and his team have utilized the American cockroach as a foundational subject, examining its medicinal effects through evidence-based medicine, alongside pharmacological and metabolomic methodologies. They advanced the technology for American cockroach medication, resolved the process of "one charcoal and three chemical methods" targeting pathogenic bacteria, viruses, and allergens associated with American cockroaches, and developed specialized equipment. Furthermore, they addressed challenges related to medication and the industrialization of American cockroaches, while establishing the production model for an American cockroach GAP factory. In 1985, they successfully created "Kangfuxin Ye." They won the third Prize of Yunnan Provincial Scientific and Technological Progress.

== Functions ==
Kangfuxin is derived from the desiccated extract of the American cockroach (Periplaneta americana), available in powder form (Kangfuxin Fen, Rehabilitation New Powder) or liquid form (Kangfuxin Ye, Rehabilitation New Liquid). It is often made in liquid form, exhibiting a light brown hue, a subtle odor, and a sweet texture.

The oothecae are produced asexually, without fertilization. Furthermore, the medicine may be utilized topically by applying medical gauze saturated with the liquid to the affected region.

== See also ==
- Cockroach farming
