= Cockroach farming =

Breeding cockroaches as livestock

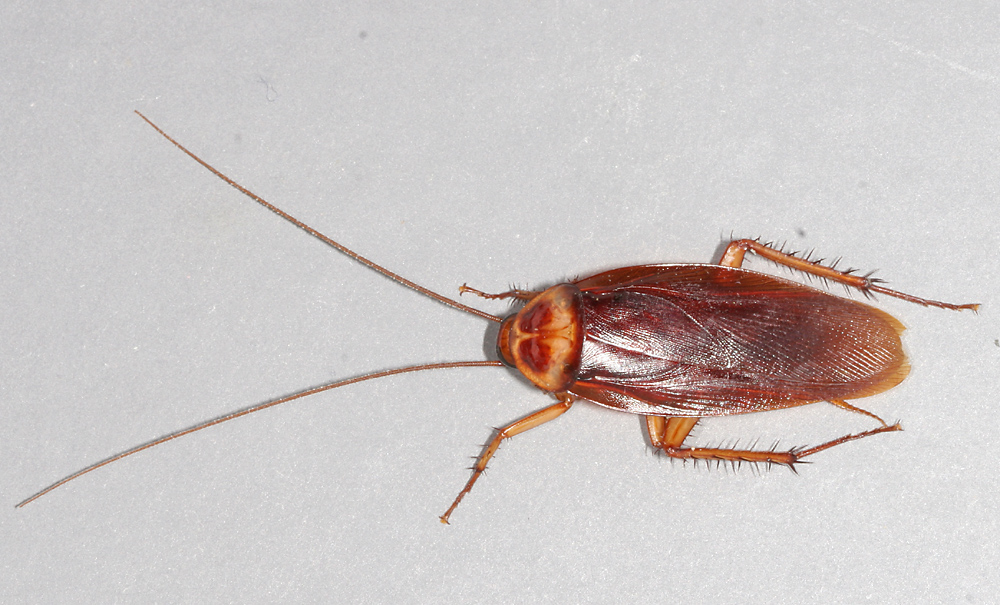
Periplaneta americana (American cockroach) – the favoured species for farming

Cockroach farming is a specific type of insect farming that involves the breeding of cockroaches as livestock in controlled facilities. Such farming is a sizable industry in China, where large buildings are home to millions of insects. They can be raised as a food source for humans, as feed for non-human animals such as lizards, or sold to the pharmaceutical industry for use in medicine. The cockroaches are often killed in vats of boiling water before being dried, and, depending on their purpose, they may be crushed, ready for processing. Prospective farmers are able to obtain how-to kits to begin their farming venture, while larger companies are able to produce billions of cockroaches every year.

== Market ==
The Traditional Chinese Medicine industry and cosmetic companies are primary purchasers of the insect. Cockroaches are a cheap source of protein, and, like other insects, are proposed as an alternative to the meat industry. Cosmetic companies value the cellulose-like quality of cockroach wings.

Pharmaceutical companies are using cockroaches as research potential for new cures, including treatments for cancer and AIDS. The School of Pharmacy and Chemistry at the Dali University has published papers regarding the anti-carcinogenic properties of cockroaches. A potion made from cockroaches (Kangfuxin Ye) is taken by millions of people in China, where the local authorities claim they have "remarkable effects". According to a government report, "more than 40 million people have been cured" of a variety of ailments after being prescribed the potion. However, there is no scientific evidence of these claims.

The Institute of Stem Cell Biology and Regenerative Medicine in Bangalore, India — along with other institutions — are investigating the possibility of farming cockroaches for their milk. The Pacific beetle cockroach (Diploptera punctata) produces a crystal-like milk which is a potential "superfood".

=== Growth in China ===
The industry is booming in China, where dried cockroaches can sell for up to US$20 a pound. In 2013, it was estimated that there were around 100 cockroach farms in China. The growth in the industry coincides with public pressure to end other sorts of farming, particularly those which supply traditional Chinese cooking and the pharmaceutical industry. Environmental and humanitarian concerns make certain ingredients derived from animal products increasingly difficult to obtain.

The largest cockroach farm is near Xichang, Sichuan, southwestern China, where it breeds six billion cockroaches a year. Run by the Good Doctor Pharmaceutical Group, the company uses artificial intelligence systems to monitor the conditions in the farm. This includes keeping them in dimly-lit spaces at around 30 degrees Celsius.

The growth of the industry in China has been helped by the lack of government regulation, with companies free to begin in most suitable environments if they have a licence to breed bugs.

== Ease and profitability ==
Cockroach farmers describe the insects as being "easy to raise and profitable". Cockroaches are omnivores and can feed on rotten vegetables, a readily available and cheap source of food. This allows farms to feed the livestock with the waste product of other industries such as potato and pumpkin peelings from local restaurants. Gathering the insects is also a relatively simple process; they can easily be vacuumed out of their nests, drowned in a vat of boiling water, and then dried in the sun.

As an insect, cockroaches are not susceptible to the same diseases as mammals and poultry. The hardy creatures have a widely reported capacity for survival. The American cockroach (Periplaneta americana) in particular has the second-largest genome of known insect genomes. An unusual number of their genes relate to taste and smell, which helps them to avoid toxic food. Genes relating to development and immunity help cockroaches grow quickly and resist disease. The American cockroach is the most popular species for farming. Start-up costs for cockroach farms are low, and there are few regulations. "How-to" kits are available for enterprising farmers.

== Challenges ==
Some farmers choose to hide the nature of their farm, referring to it as "special farming" in an attempt at secrecy. This is due to the stigma attached to the creatures and the possible negative reaction from neighbouring organisations.

One primary cause for concern with such farms is the potential for the insects to escape, something that could lead to a "catastrophe" according to Zhu Chaodong, a professor and head of insect evolution studies at the Institute of Zoology in Beijing. In August 2013, over a million cockroaches escaped from a farm in Jiangsu province. The insects were kept inside an unregistered building too close to a protected watershed. When the owner was out to lunch, the authorities, who did not know about the roaches, razed the structure. They had to come back to exterminate the insects afterward.
