= Aquaculture of sea cucumbers =

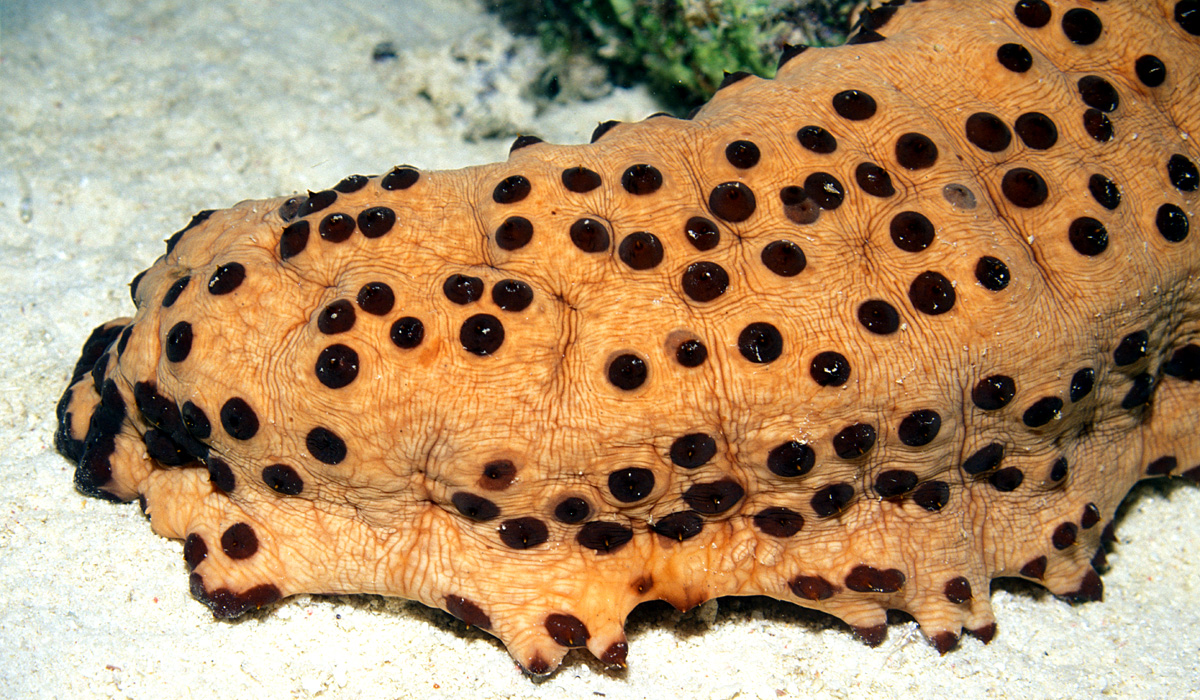
Sea cucumbers are usually scavengers which feed on the debris on the sea floor

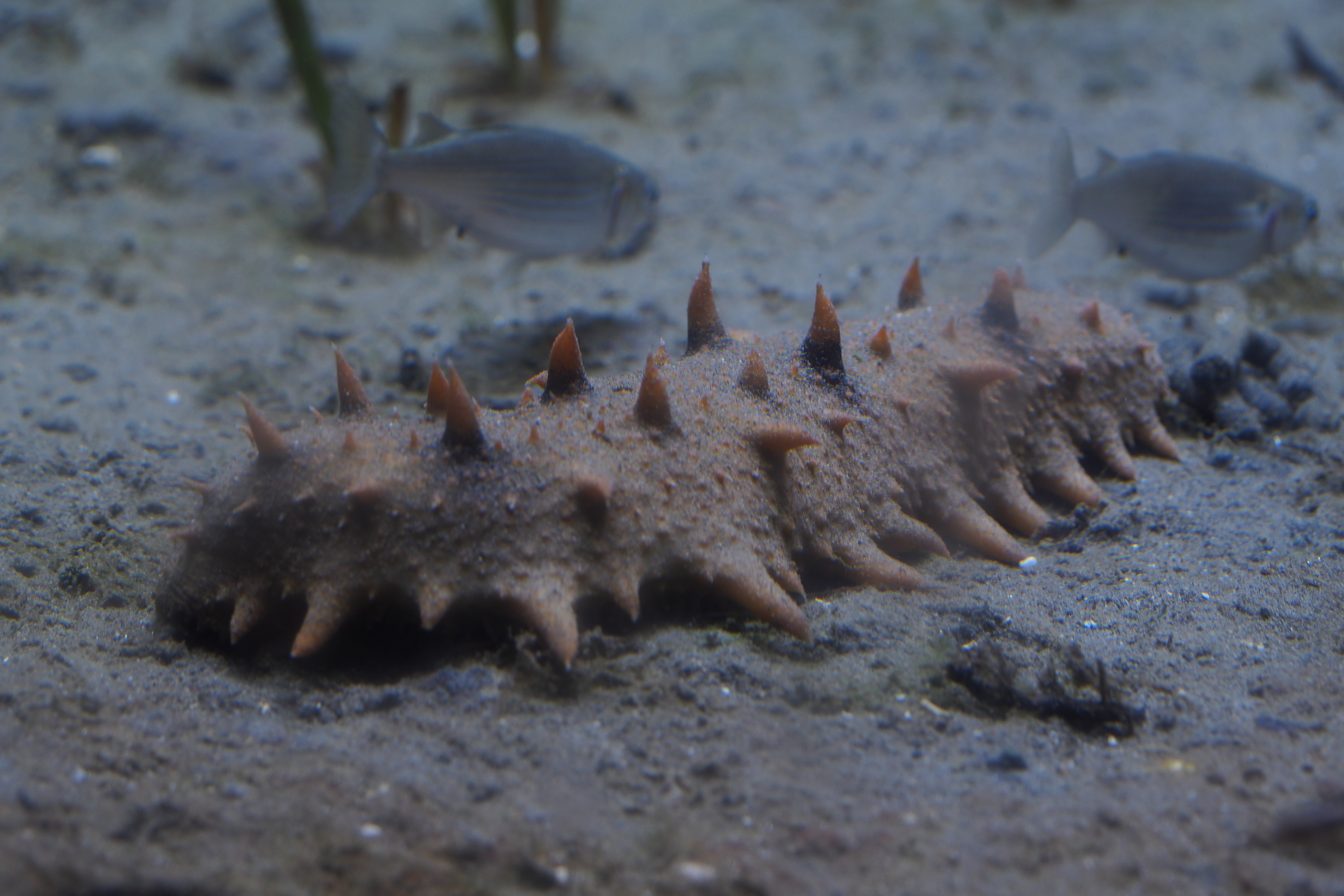
Apostichopus japonicus, the most cultivated sea cucumber species

Sea cucumber stocks have been overexploited in the wild, resulting in incentives to grow them by aquaculture. Aquaculture means the sea cucumbers are farmed in contained areas where they can be cultured in a controlled manner. In China, sea cucumbers are cultured in integrated multi-trophic systems, along with prawns and some fish species. In these systems, the sea cucumbers feed on the waste and feces from the other species. In this manner, what would otherwise be polluting byproducts from the culture of the other species become a valuable resource that is turned into a marketable product.

== History ==
The Chinese and Japanese were the first to develop successful hatchery technology for Apostichopus japonicus, prized for its high meat content and success in commercial hatcheries. A second species, Holothuria scabra, was cultured for the first time using these techniques in India in 1988. In recent years Australia, Indonesia, New Caledonia, Maldives, Solomon Islands and Vietnam have also successfully cultured H. scabra using the same technology, which has since been expanded to other species.

== Broodstock ==
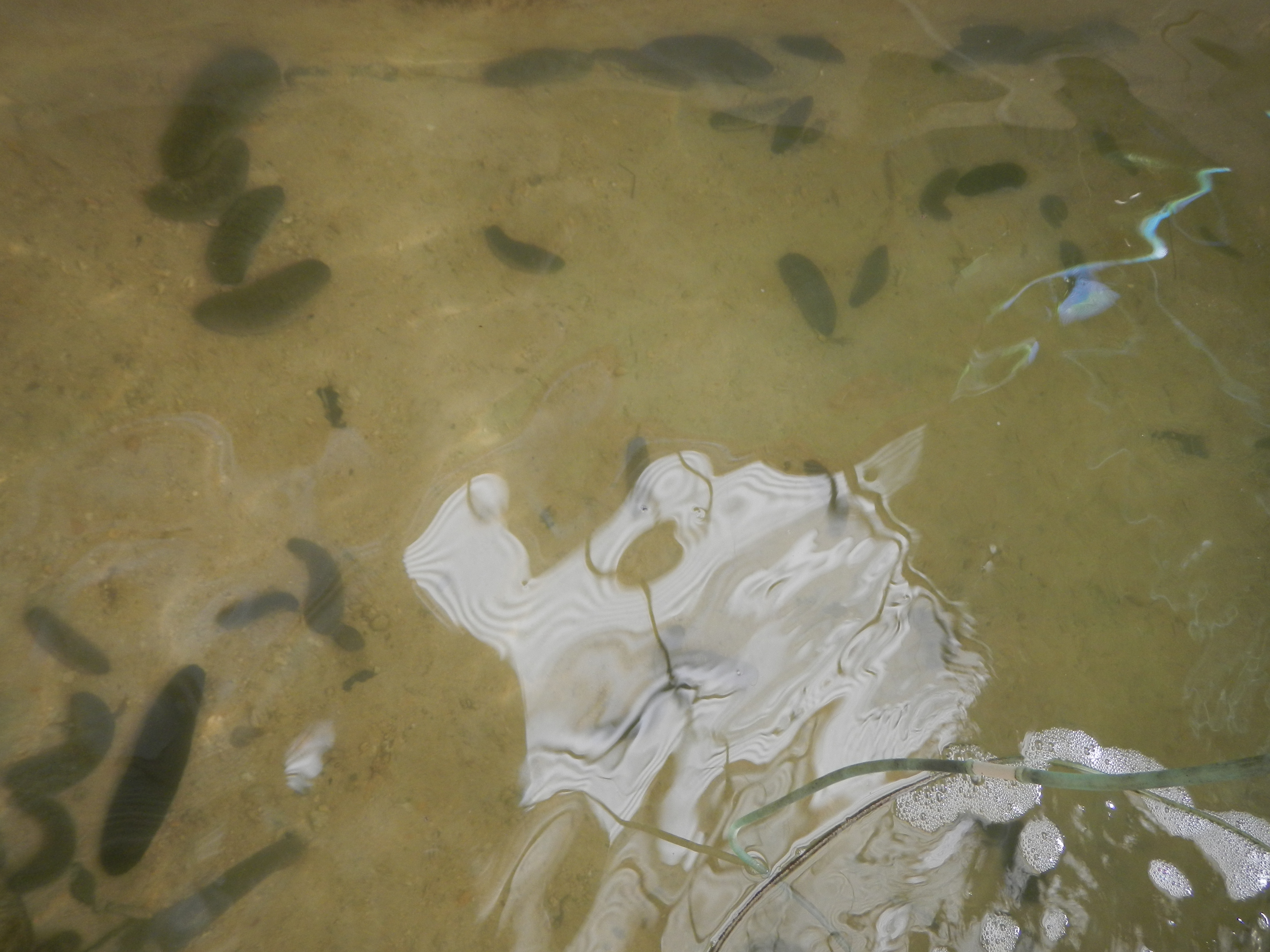
The Philippine "Balatan" or Sea cucumber breeding/harvesting.

Sea cucumbers to be used as broodstock are either collected from the wild or are taken from commercial harvests. Only the largest and healthiest individuals are used for broodstock, as the success of a hatchery relies on the healthy condition of brood individuals. These individuals are kept in tanks with at least 6 inches of sand to allow burrowing behaviour. Water is changed every day and sand is changed every fortnight. Sea cucumbers are fed with a paste made from freshly collected algae added to the tanks once a week to settle on sand where they feed. If water conditions are not right and if proper food is not provided sea cucumbers will eviscerate or re-absorb their gonads rendering them unfit for spawning.

== Spawning ==
Temperature shock involves cooling and heating of seawater by 3–5°C until spawning is induced. This is achieved by first reducing the temperature of the water by 3–5°C. The sea cucumbers are left for five minutes before they are exposed to ‘normal’ (depending on species and climate) temperature seawater, where the small rise in water temperature is sufficient to induce spawning. Males tend to spawn first which then induces females to release their eggs.

Spawning stimulation can also be achieved through lightly drying the broodstock followed by exposure to a powerful jet of seawater. Sea cucumbers are dried for 30 minutes in the shade and then are exposed to a powerful jet of seawater for 30 minutes. Usually 60–90 minutes later males will release their sperm, and 30 minutes after that females will swell and release eggs in rapid intermittent jets.

Though many species of sea cucumbers can be induced to spawn using both of these methods, temperature shock is usually considered to be the preferred method. Often spawn obtained from drying and wetting with a jet of water does not produce viable gametes. Spawning induction and successful fertilization has only been achieved in some species of sea cucumbers and the likelihood that a method will work or not is highly dependent on the species.

== Larvae ==
The first month after hatching is particularly crucial and mortality during the larval phases is particularly high. Larval survival drops to 30 – 34% after the first 20 days of hatching and larval development. Larvae usually hatch 48 hours after fertilisation and spend their first 17 days as feeding larvae or auricularia. During this phase they are fed on a mix of planktonic microalgae (Rhodomonas salina, Chaetoceros calcitrans, C. mulleri, Isochrysis galbana and Pavlova lutheri are most commonly used). The proportions and overall quantity of microalgal feed species varies with larval stage, and the quantity is gradually increased as larvae grow until they metamorphose into the doliolaria or non-feeding phase (around day 17.) Individuals in this phase of their development are put into a tank with settlement cues. These may include food items such as seagrass extract, seaweed extract, Algamac2000, Algamac Protein Plus, dead algae, benthic diatoms (Nitzschia sp. and Navicula sp.) and spirulina.

Around day 19 of development the larvae transform into their pentacula phase and settle. Plates or polythene sheets are provided as substrate for larvae to settle on and to feed off. Benthic diatoms Nitzschia sp. and Navicula sp. are most effective as settlement cues.

== Nursery ==
Juveniles are sometimes transferred to a sand-based feeding substrate in nursery tanks when they reach 10 mm; however, survival of juveniles is better if they are allowed to grow to 20 mm before transferral to sand. Juveniles are grown for a few months until they reach 5–7 cm when they are moved out to sea ranches or into ponds.

== Grow out ==
Sea ranching is carried out in sheltered bays with seagrass in areas with few predators. The sea cucumbers can be kept in pens in shallow water made of fine wire mesh or bamboo, and in deeper water they are raised in cages made from fine woven mesh or in tub enclosures on the seafloor. They can also be kept and grown in ponds with appropriate water exchange and movement. Individual growth is density-dependent and is stunted at high densities. Monitoring water quality and growth characteristics are essential to survival during this phase. Sea cucumbers are ready to harvest after 12 months of grow out.

== Asexual methods ==
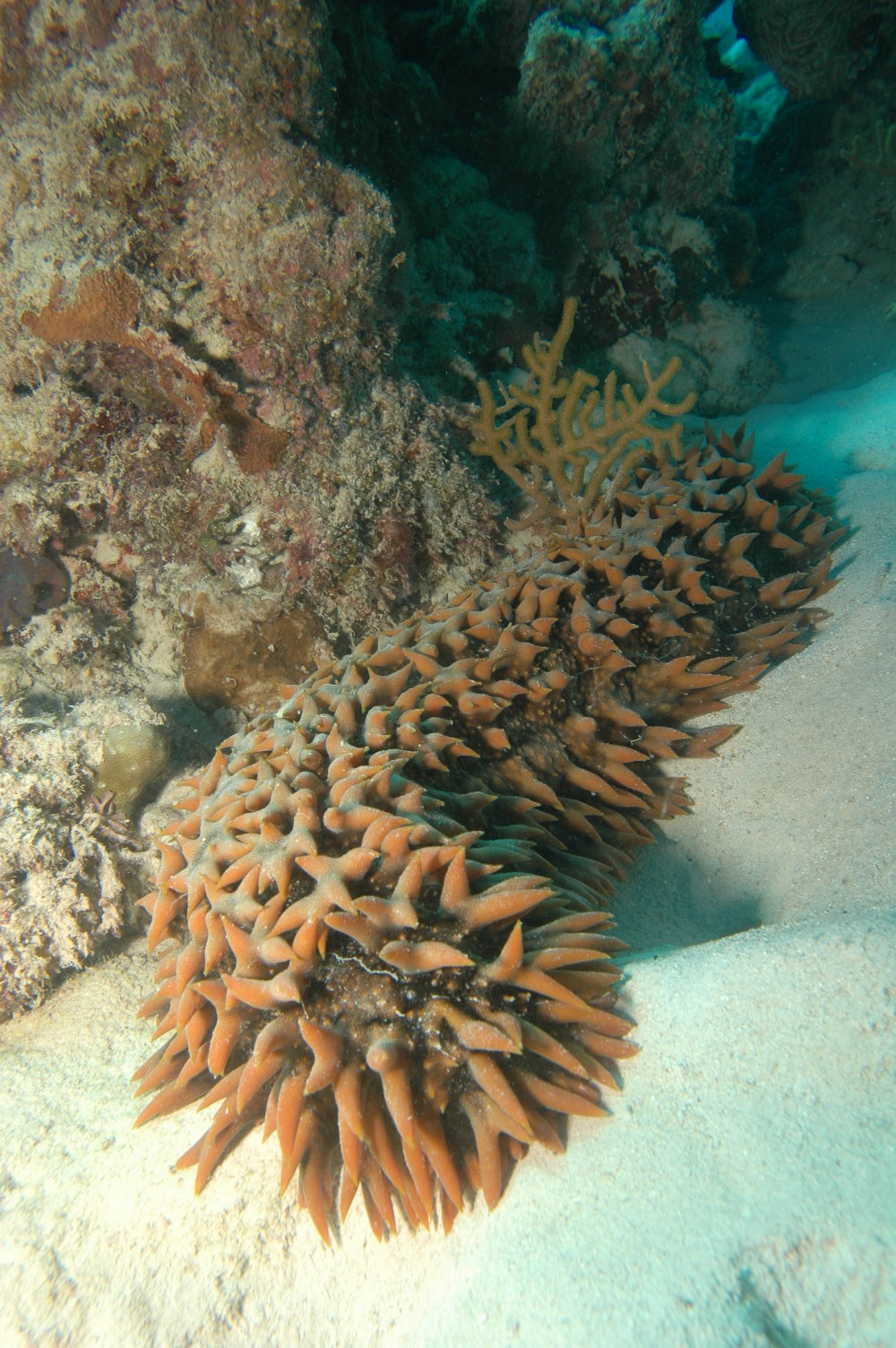
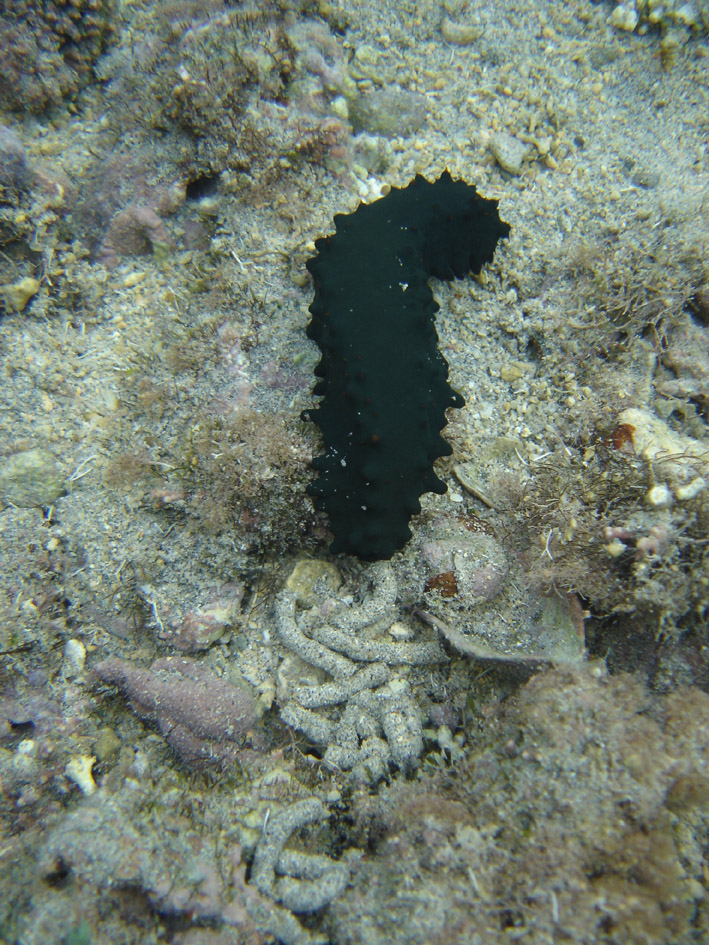
The prickly redfish (left) and greenfish (right)
can be asexually propagated

Two sea cucumber species Thelenota ananas (prickly redfish) and Stichopus chloronotus (greenfish) have been found capable of asexual propagation through transverse fission, the process whereby an organism is cut in half and completely regenerates the missing half. Rubber bands are placed around the middle of the sea cucumbers which induces them to undergo fission within 1–2 weeks. After separating, the posterior half regrows a complete anterior half, and vice versa. This happens within 3–7 months, producing two new fully-grown individuals from one. Survival from this process by these species was found to be 80% or greater. Though this technique is not suitable for all sea cucumber species, it may provide a cheaper and faster alternative method of obtaining prickly redfish and greenfish for aquaculture.

== Polyculture ==
Sea cucumbers are currently cultured in polyculture with prawns and some fish species. Their presence in the bottoms of the pens or nets, where they feed on debris composed of feces, excess food, algae, and other particulate organic matter, significantly reduces fouling of water and equipment. China currently produces around 90,000 tons of sea cucumbers using these practices and enhanced growth of sea cucumber juveniles has been reported when they are grown at the bottom of prawn farms. Farming sea cucumbers with the fouling debris of other aquaculture species helps to mitigate the impacts of marine farms' effluents and turns these wastes into a marketable product.

== Further references ==
- Lovatelli A, Conand C, Purcell S, Uthicke S, J Hamel S and Mercier A (Eds) (2004) Advances in sea cucumber aquaculture and management FAO Fisheries technical paper 463. Rome.
- Toral-Granda V, Lovatelli A and Vasconcellos M (Eds) (2008) Sea cucumbers: A global review of fisheries and trade FAO Fisheries technical paper 516. Rome.
