= Hirudiculture =

Farming of leeches

Hirudiculture is the culture, or farming, of leeches in both natural and artificial environments. This practice drew the attention of Parisian savants and members of the French Société Zoologique d'Acclimitation in the mid-to-late 19th century as a part of a larger interest in the culture of fish and oysters. Leech culture was seen as a solution to growing demand for medicinal leeches throughout the world.

The use of leeches for medicinal purposes, or hirudotherapy, has been revived by contemporary medicine.

== See also ==
- Aquaculture
