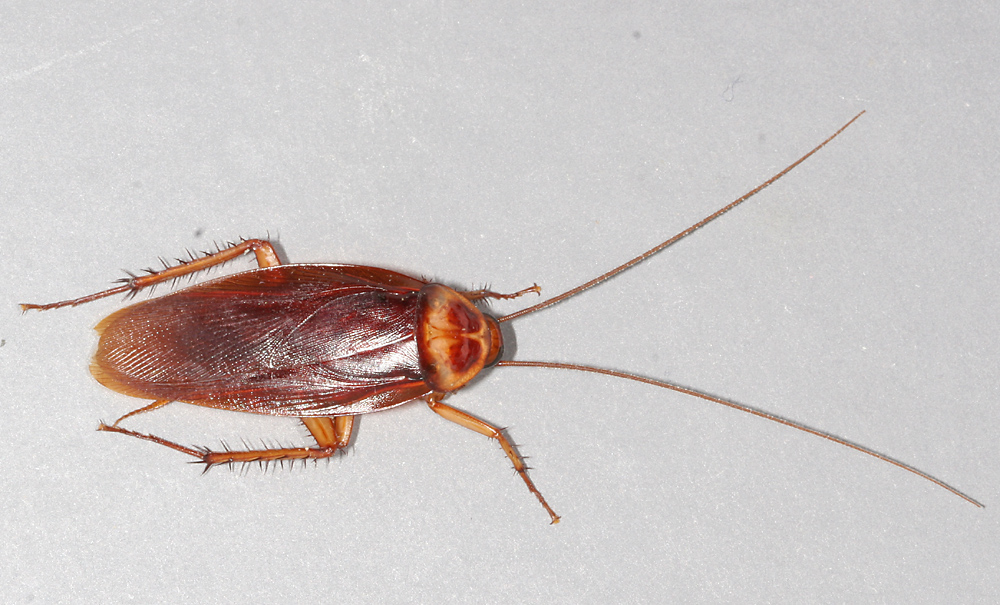
- Footage of an American Cockroach, first in real time, then slowed down to one-tenth speed

Scientific classification
- Kingdom: Animalia
- Phylum: Arthropoda
- Clade: Pancrustacea
- Class: Insecta
- Order: Blattodea
- Family: Blattidae
- Genus: Periplaneta
- Species: P. americana

Binomial name
- Periplaneta americana (Linnaeus, 1758)

Synonyms
- List: Blatta americana Linnaeus, 1758; Blatta ferrugineofusca Gronovius, 1764; Blatta kakkerlac De Geer, 1773; Blatta orientalis Sulzer, 1776 (Preocc.); Blatta aurelianensis Fourcroy, 1785; Blatta siccifolia Stoll, 1813; Blatta heros Eschscholtz, 1822; Blatta domicola Risso, 1826; Periplaneta stolida Walker, 1868; Periplaneta colorata Rehn, 1901

= American cockroach =

Species of cockroach

The American cockroach (Periplaneta americana) is the largest species of cockroach routinely found in homes, and often considered a pest. In certain regions of the U.S. it is colloquially known as the waterbug, though it is not a true waterbug since it is not aquatic, nor a Hemipteran. It is also known as the ship cockroach, kakerlac, and Bombay canary. It is often misidentified as a palmetto bug.

Despite their name, American cockroaches are native to Africa and the Middle East. They are believed to have been introduced to the Americas only from the 17th century onward as a result of human commercial patterns, including the Atlantic slave trade.

== Distribution ==
Despite the name, none of the Periplaneta species is native to the Americas; P. americana was introduced to what is now the United States from Africa as early as 1625. They are now common in tropical climates because human activity has extended the insects' range of habitation, and are virtually cosmopolitan in distribution as a result of global commerce.

== Biology ==
=== Characteristics ===
Of all common cockroach species, the American cockroach has the largest body size, and has the longest life cycle, up to about 700 days. It molts 6–14 times (mostly 13 times) before metamorphosis.

It has an average length around 4 cm (1.6 in) and is about 7 mm (0.28 in) tall. They are reddish brown and have a yellowish margin on the pronotum, the body region behind the head. Immature cockroaches resemble adults, except that they are wingless.

The insect can travel quickly, often darting out of sight when a threat is perceived, and can fit into small cracks and under doors despite its fairly large size. It is considered one of the fastest-running insects.

In an experiment, a P. americana registered a record speed of 5.4 km/h (3.4 mph), about 50 body lengths per second, which would be comparable to a human running at 330 km/h (210 mph).

It has a pair of large compound eyes, each having over 3,500 individual lenses (ommatidia, hexagonal apertures which provide a kind of vision known as mosaic vision, with more sensitivity but less resolution, particularly useful at night). It is a very active night insect that shuns light.

American cockroach nymphs are capable of limb regeneration.

=== Life cycle ===
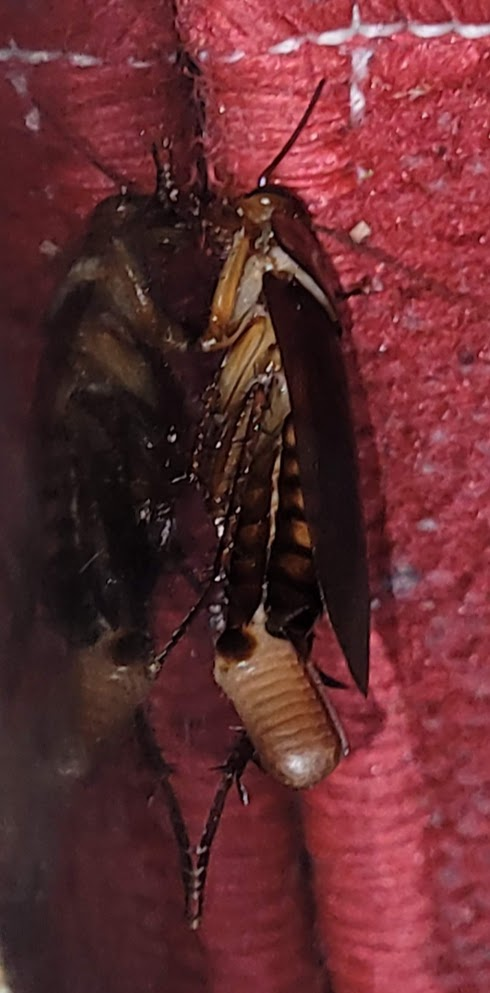
Ootheca attached to the abdomen of an American cockroach

American cockroaches have three developmental stages: egg, nymph, and adult. Females produce an egg case (ootheca) which protrudes from the tip of the abdomen. On average, females produce 9–10 oothecae, although they can sometimes produce as many as 90. After about two days, the egg cases are placed on a surface in a safe location. Egg cases are about 0.9 cm (0.35 in) long, brown, and purse-shaped. Immature cockroaches emerge from egg cases in 6–8 weeks and require 6–12 months to mature. After hatching, the nymphs feed and undergo a series of 13 moultings (or ecdysis). Adult cockroaches can live up to an additional year, during which females produce an average of 150 young. The American cockroach reproductive cycle can last up to 600 days.

=== Sex pheromone ===
The sex pheromone of the American cockroach is the sequiterpene (1Z,5E)-1,10(14)-diepoxy-4(15),5-germacradien-9-one, which has been given the trivial name periplanone-B. This pheromone was isolated from the feces of virgin female cockroaches. Previously, 2,2-dimethyl-3-isopropylidenecyclopropyl propionate had been thought to be the structure of this pheromone, but on synthesis was shown to be inactive. The structure determination of this pheromone was an eventful chapter in the history of pheromone chemistry.

=== Parthenogenesis ===
When female American cockroaches are housed in groups, this close association promotes facultative parthenogenic reproduction. The oothecae are produced asexually, without fertilization. The process by which the eggs are produced is automixis; during automixis, meiosis occurs, but instead of giving rise to haploid gametes as ordinarily happens, diploid gametes are produced (probably by terminal fusion of meiotic products) that can then develop into female cockroaches. Eggs produced by parthenogenesis have lower viability than eggs produced by sexual reproduction.

=== Genetics ===
The American cockroach genome is the second-largest insect genome on record, after Locusta migratoria. Around 60% of its genome is composed of repeat elements. Around 90% of the genome can be found in other members of Blattodea. The genome codes for a large number of chemoreceptor families, including 522 taste receptors and 154 olfactory receptors. The 522 taste receptors comprise the largest number found among insects for which genomes have been sequenced. About 329 of the taste receptors are involved in bitter taste perception. These traits, along with enlarged groups of genes relating to detoxification, the immune system, and growth and reproduction, are believed to be part of the reasons behind the cockroach's ability to adapt to human living spaces.

=== Diet ===
American cockroaches are omnivorous and opportunistic feeders that eat materials such as cheese, sweets, beer, tea, leather, bakery products, starch in book bindings, manuscripts, glue, hair, flakes of dried skin, dead animals, plant materials, soiled clothing, and glossy paper with starch sizing. They are particularly fond of fermenting foods. They have also been observed to feed upon dead or wounded cockroaches of their own or other species.

=== Flight ===
American cockroaches in the immature (nymph) stage are wingless and incapable of flight. Adults have useful wings and can fly for short distances. If they start from a high place, such as a tree, they can glide for some distance. However, despite their ability to do so, American cockroaches aren't regular fliers. They can run very fast and, when frightened, these insects more commonly scatter on foot.

== Habitat ==
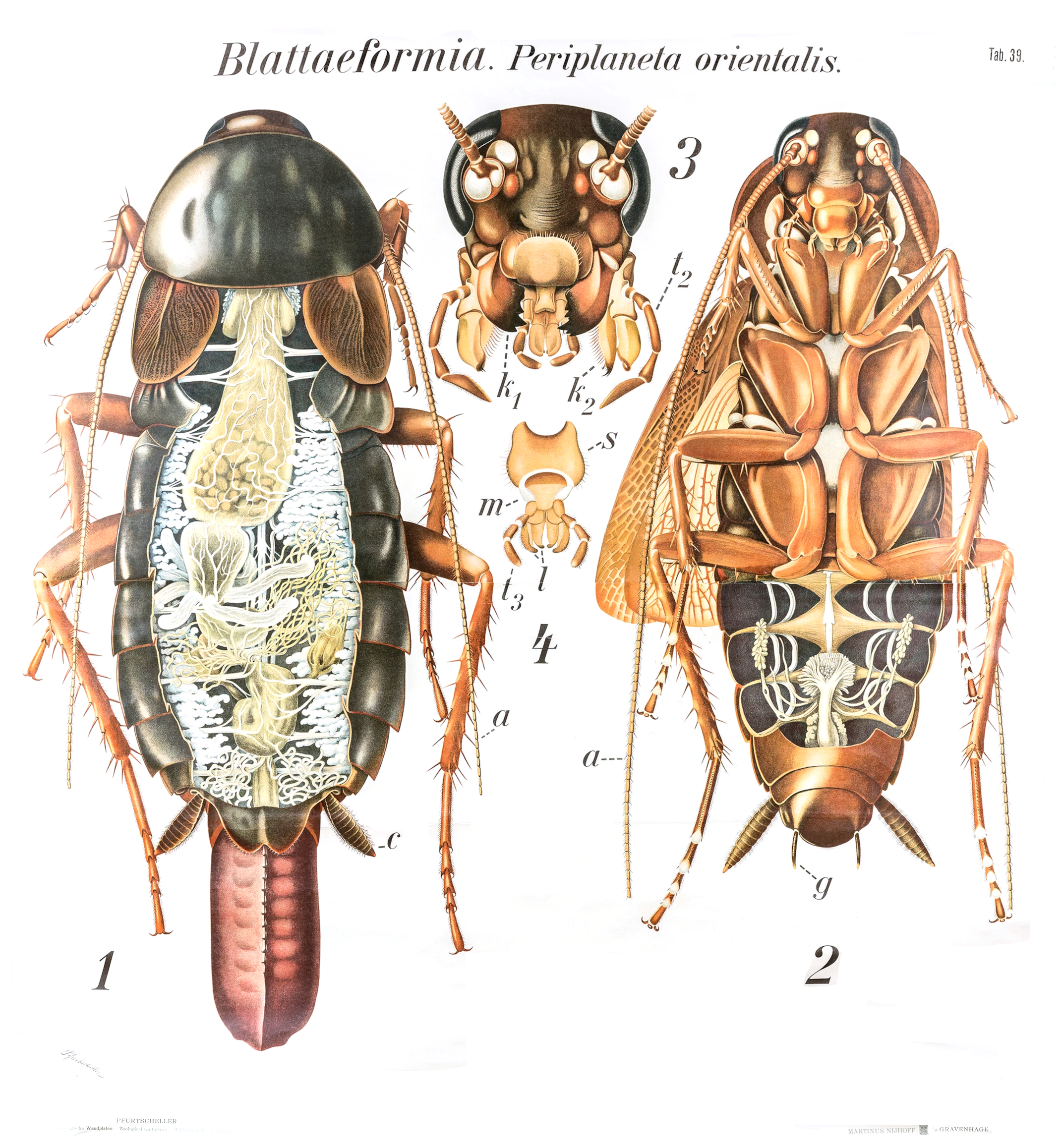
Anatomy

American cockroaches generally live in moist areas but can survive in dry areas if they have access to water. They prefer high temperatures around 29 °C (84 °F) and do not tolerate low temperatures. These cockroaches are common in basements, crawl spaces, cracks and crevices of porches, foundations, and walkways adjacent to buildings. In residential areas outside the tropics, these cockroaches live in basements and sewers and may move outdoors into yards during warm weather. Adult American cockroaches were not able to survive several days at ≤10°C. Under constant temperatures of 8, 9, and 10°C, approximately 40% of cockroaches died within 72 hours.

== Relationship with humans ==
=== Risk to humans ===
The odorous secretions produced by American cockroaches can alter the flavor of food. Also, if populations of cockroaches are high, a strong concentration of this odorous secretion can be present. Cockroaches can pick up disease-causing bacteria, such as Salmonella, on their legs, and later deposit them on foods and cause food poisoning or infection if they walk on the food. House dust containing cockroach feces and body parts can trigger allergic reactions and asthma in certain individuals.

At least 22 species of pathogenic human bacteria, viruses, fungi, and protozoans, as well as five species of helminthic worms, have been isolated from field-collected P. americana (L.)

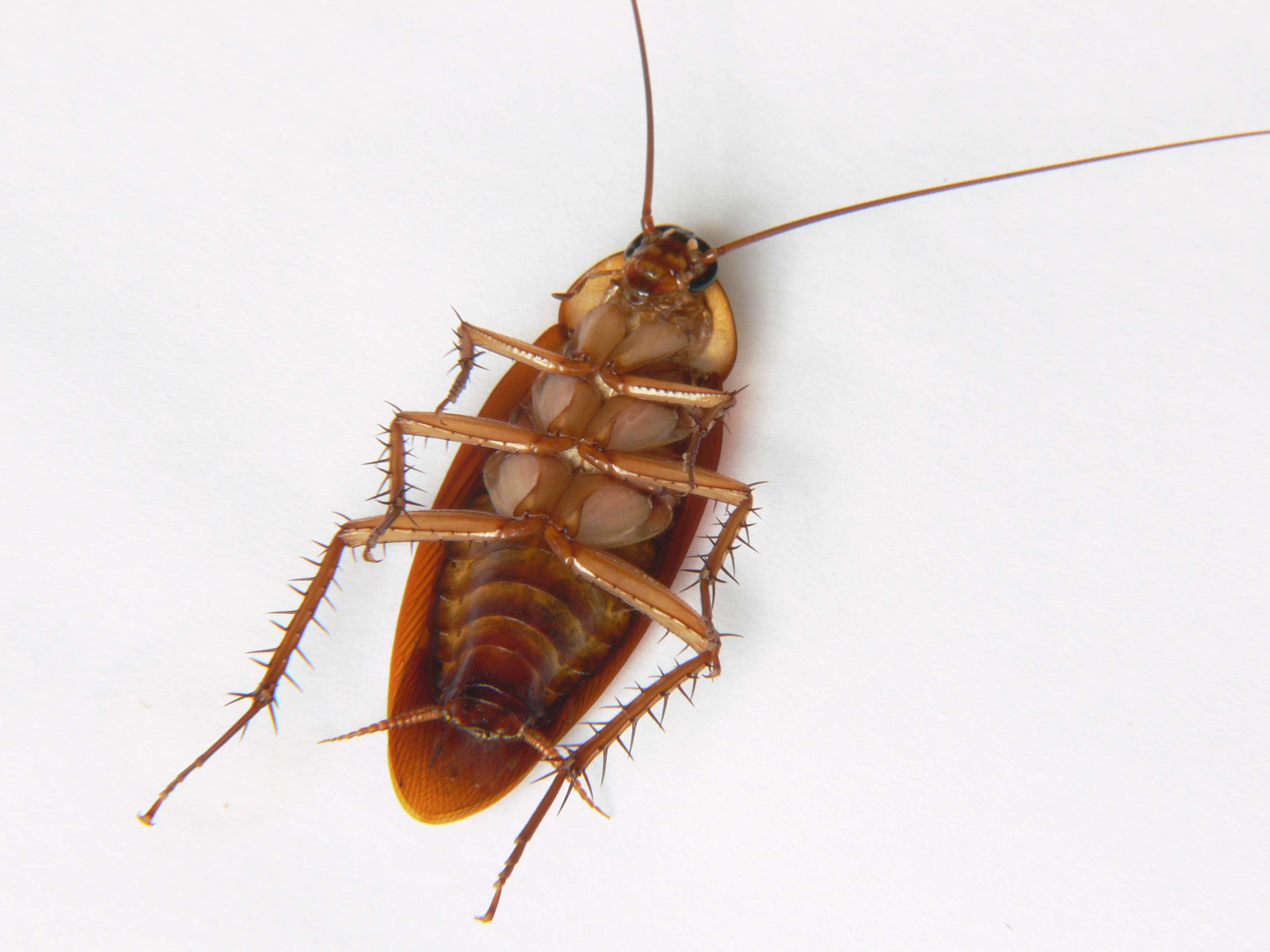
Underside of P. americana

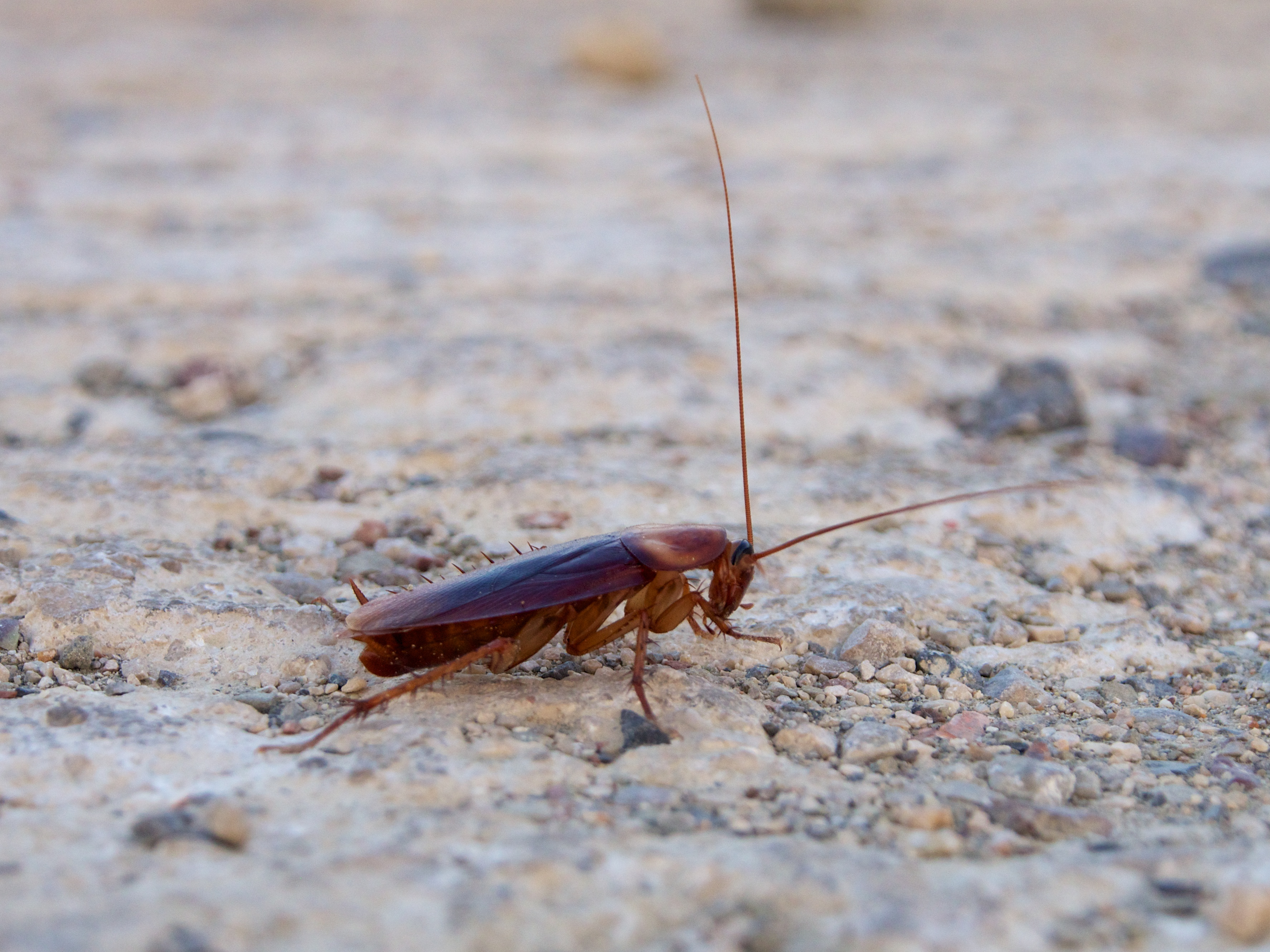
P. americana, view from side

=== Control as pests ===
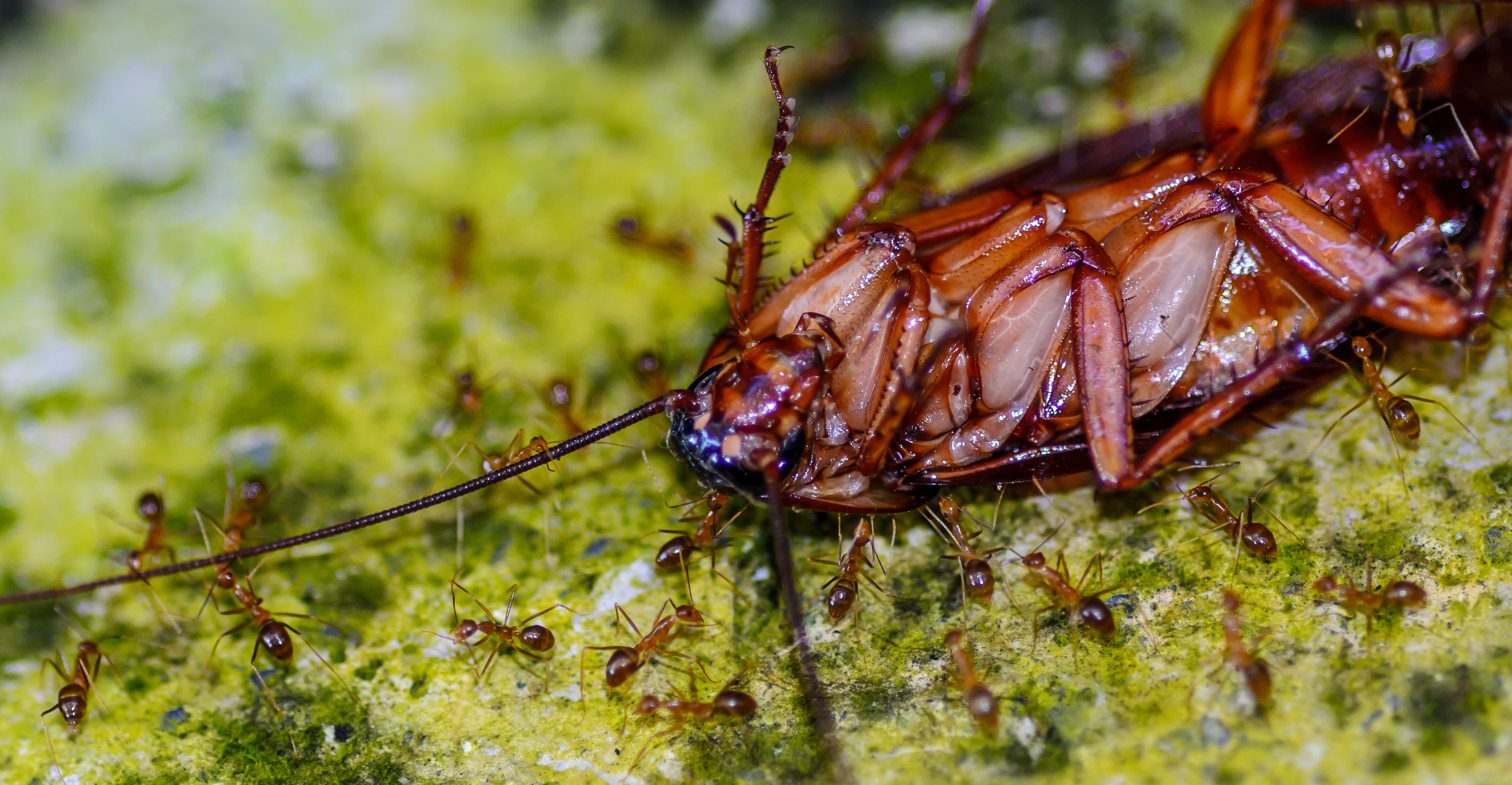
Anoplolepis gracilipes (yellow crazy ants) moving a dead American cockroach toward their nest in Pohnpei, Micronesia

In cold climates, these cockroaches may move indoors, seeking warmer environments and food. Cockroaches may enter houses via wastewater plumbing, underneath doors, or via air ducts or other openings in the walls, windows or foundation. Cockroach populations may be controlled through the use of glue board traps or insecticides. Glue board traps (also called adhesive or sticky traps) are made using adhesive applied to cardboard or similar material. Bait can be placed in the center or a scent may be added to the adhesive. Inexpensive glue board traps are normally placed in warm indoor locations readily accessible to insects but not likely to be encountered by people: underneath refrigerators or freezers, behind trash cans, etc.

Covering any cracks or crevices through which cockroaches may enter, sealing food inside insect-proof containers, and quickly cleaning any spills or messes that have been made is beneficial. Another way to prevent an infestation is to thoroughly check any materials brought inside: cockroaches and their egg cases (ootheca) can be hidden inside or on furniture, or inside boxes, suitcases, grocery bags, etc. Upon finding an egg case, use a napkin to pick it up and then forcefully crush it; the resulting fluid leakage will then indicate the destruction of the eggs inside. Discard the napkin and the destroyed egg case as garbage.

=== Use in traditional Chinese medicine ===
The American cockroach has been used as an ingredient in traditional Chinese medicine, with references to its usage in the Compendium of Materia Medica and Shennong Ben Cao Jing. In China, an ethanol extract of the American cockroach, Kāngfùxīn Yè (康复新液), is prescribed for wound healing and tissue repair.

== Comparison of three common cockroaches ==
| Roach | German cockroach | Oriental cockroach | American cockroach |
| Size | 13–16 mm (0.51–0.63 in) | 18–29 mm (0.71–1.14 in) | 29–53 mm (1.1–2.1 in) |
| Preferred temperature | 15–35 °C (59–95 °F) | 20–30 °C (68–86 °F) | 20–29 °C (68–84 °F) |
| Nymphal development (Note: Dependent on several factors, including temperature (significantly), sex, and nutrition.) | 54–215 days (at 24–35 °C (75–95 °F)) | 164–542 days (at 22–30 °C (72–86 °F)) | 150–360 days (at 25–30 °C (77–86 °F)) |
| Lifespan | Around 200 days | 35–190 days | 90–706 days |
| Able to fly? | Uncommon (Note: German cockroaches can glide, especially males, but powered flight is uncommon.) | No | Yes (Note: American cockroaches can fly short distances, usually starting from high places, but real flight is uncommon, despite popular belief.) |
