= Insect farming =

Raising and breeding insects as livestock

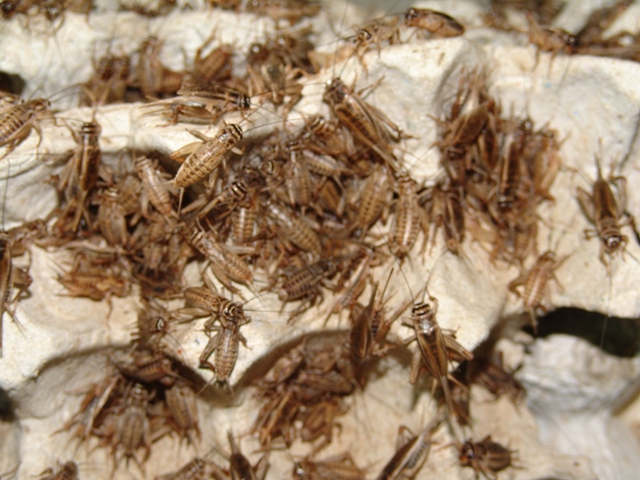
Farming of crickets in Thailand

Insect farming is the practice of raising and breeding insects as livestock, also referred to as minilivestock or micro stock. Insects may be farmed for the commodities they produce (like silk, honey, lac or insect tea), or for them themselves; to be used as food, as feed, as a dye, and otherwise.

== Farming of popular insects ==
=== Silkworms ===
Silkworms, the caterpillars of the domestic silkmoth, are kept to produce silk, an elastic fiber made when they are in the process of creating a cocoon. Silk is commonly regarded as a major cash crop and is used in the crafting of many textiles.

=== Mealworms ===
The mealworm (Tenebrio molitor L.) is the larva form of a species of darkling beetles (Coleoptera). The optimum incubation temperature is 25 ̊C - 27 ̊C and its embryonic development lasts 4 – 6 days. It has a long larval period of about half a year with the optimal temperature and low moisture. The protein content of Tenebrio molitor larvae, adult, exuvium and excreta are 46.44, 63.34, 32.87, and 18.51% respectively.

=== Buffaloworms ===
Buffaloworms, also called lesser mealworms, is the common name of Alphitobius diaperinus. Its larvae superficially resemble small wireworms or true mealworms (Tenebrio spp.). They are approximately 7 to 11 mm in length at the last instar. Freshly emerged larvae are a milky color. The pale color tinge returns to that of the first/second instar larva when preparing to molt, while a yellowish-brown appearance after molting. In addition, it was reported that it has the highest level of iron bioavailability.

=== Honeybees ===
Commodities harvested from honeybees include beeswax, bee bread, bee pollen, propolis, royal jelly, brood, and honey. All of the aforementioned are mostly used in food, however, being wax, beeswax has many other uses, such as being used in candles, and propolis may be used as a wood finish. However, the presence of honeybees can negatively affect abundance and diversity of wild bees, with consequences for pollination of crops.

=== Lac insects ===
Lac insects secrete a resinous substance called lac. Lac is used in many applications, from its use in food to being used as a colorant or as a wood finish. The majority of lac farming takes place in India and Thailand, with over 2 million residential employees.

=== Cochineal ===
Made into a red dye known as carmine, cochineal are incorporated into many products, including cosmetics, food, paint, and fabric. About 100,000 insects are needed to make a single kilogram of dye. The shade of red the dye yields depends on how the insect is processed. France is the world's largest importer of carmine.

=== Crickets ===
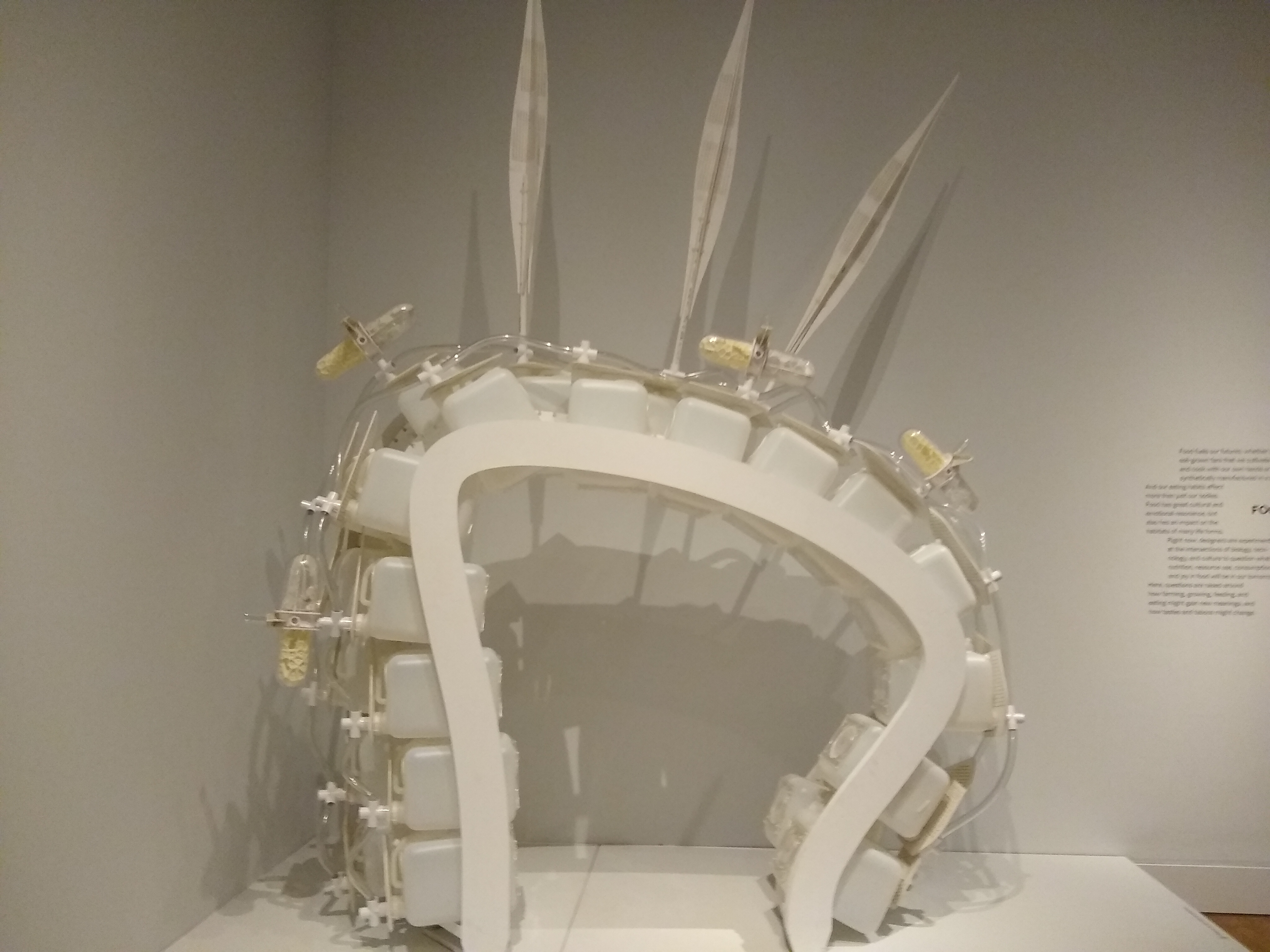
Cricket Shelter Modular Edible Insect Farm, designed by Terreform ONE

Among the hundreds of different types of crickets, the house cricket (Acheta domesticus) is the most common type used for human consumption. The cricket is one of the most nutritious edible insects, and in many parts of the world, crickets are consumed dry-roasted, baked, deep-fried, and boiled. Cricket consumption may take the form of cricket flour, a powder of dried and ground crickets, which is easily integrated into many food recipes. Crickets are commonly farmed for non-human animal food, as they provide much nutrition to the many species of reptiles, fish, birds and other mammals that consume them. Crickets are normally killed by deep freezing.

=== Waxworms ===
Waxworms are the larvae of wax moths. These caterpillars are used widely across the world for food, fish bait, animal testing and plastic degradation. Low in protein but high in fat content, they are a valuable source of fat for many insectivorous organisms. Waxworms are popular in many parts of the world, due to their ability to live in low temperatures and their simplicity in production.

=== Cockroaches ===
Cockroaches are farmed by the million in China, where they are used in traditional medicine and in cosmetics. The main species farmed is the American cockroach (Periplaneta americana). The cockroaches are reared on food such as potato and pumpkin peeling waste from restaurants, then scooped or vacuumed from their nests, killed in boiling water and dried in the sun.

=== Black soldier flies ===
Black soldier flies (Hermetia illucens) are increasingly farmed for the bioconversion of organic waste streams into insect biomass rich in protein and lipids. The larvae are highly adaptable and can be reared on a wide range of organic side-streams, including food processing residues and agricultural by-products, while contributing to waste reduction. Substrate composition (and mainly substrate protein, fat and carbohydrate contents) can influence larval growth and conversion efficiency.

== As feed and food ==
Insects show promise as animal feed. For instance, fly larvae can replace fish meal due to the similar amino acid composition. It is possible to formulate fish meal to increase unsaturated fatty acid. Wild birds and free-range poultry can consume insects in the adult, larval and pupal forms naturally. Grasshoppers and moths, as well as houseflies, have been used as feed supplements for poultry. Apart from that, insects have potential as feed for reptiles, fish, mammals, as well as birds.

Hundreds of species of crickets, grasshoppers, beetles, moths and various other insects are considered edible. Selected species are farmed for human consumption. Humans have been eating insects for as long as (according to some sources) 30,000 years. Although the insect farming industry offers environmental benefits if positioned as an alternative to meat, there is currently little focus on this market. Insects bred in captivity offer a low space-intensive, highly feed-efficient, relatively pollution-free, high-protein source of food for both humans and non-human animals. Insects have a high nutritional value, dense protein content and micronutrient and probiotic potential. Insects such as crickets and mealworms have high concentrations of complete protein, vitamin B12, riboflavin and vitamin A. Insects offer an economical solution to increasingly pressing food security and environmental issues concerning the production and distribution of protein to feed a growing world population, although a number of recent industrial failures call these advantages into question.

The supposed environmental benefits of insects farming rely on the assumption that it replaces traditional animal farming, which is more polluting. But part of the production is used to feed livestock instead of humans. Additionally, insects that are intensively farmed are usually fed with cereals and soya that could feed humans. According to Time, "Black soldier flies and Argentinian cockroaches are among the most efficient insect species, with food conversion ratios of between 1.4 and 2.7 to one, which means that even they eat more food than they produce", implying that "it's far better to use croplands to feed people directly than to feed farmed insects."

=== Benefits ===
Purported benefits of the use of insects as food include:

- Significantly lower amounts of resource and space use, lower amounts of waste produced, and emissions of very trace amounts of greenhouse gases, compared to traditional meat and when fed directly to humans.
- They include many vitamins and essential minerals, contain dietary fiber (which is not present in meat), and are a complete protein. The protein count of 100 g of cricket is nearly equivalent to the amount in 100 g of lean ground beef.
- As opposed to meat, lower costs are required to care for and produce insects.
- Faster growth and reproduction rates. Crickets mature rather quickly and are typically full-grown within 3 weeks to a month, and an individual female can lay from 1,200 to 1,500 eggs in three to four weeks. Cattle, however, become adults at 2 years, and the breeding ratio is four breeding animals for each market animal produced.
- Unlike meat, insects rarely transmit diseases such as H1N1, mad cow disease, or salmonella.

==== Reduced feed ====
Cattle use 12 times the amount of feed that crickets do to produce an equal amount of protein. Crickets also only use a quarter of the feed of sheep and one-half the amount of feed given to swine and chicken to produce an equivalent amount of protein. Crickets require only two pounds of feed to produce one pound of the finished product. Much of this efficiency is a result of crickets being ectothermic, as in they get their heat from the environment instead of having to expend energy to create their own body heat as typical mammals do.

==== Nutrient efficiency ====
Insects are nutrient-efficient compared to other meat sources. The insect protein content is comparable to most meat products. Likewise, the fatty acid composition of edible insects is comparable to fish lipids, with high levels of polyunsaturated fatty acids (PUFAs). In addition, all parts of edible insect are efficiently used whereas some parts of conventional livestock are not directly available for human consumption. The nutritional contents of insects vary with species as well as within species, depending on their metamorphic stage, habitat, and diet. For instance, the lipid composition of insects is largely dependent on their diet and metamorphic stage. Insects are abundant in other nutrients. Locusts, for example, contain between 8 and 20 mg of iron in every 100 grams of raw locust. Beef, on the other hand, contains roughly 6 mg of iron in the same amount of meat. Crickets are also very nutrient-efficient. For every 100 grams of substance, crickets contain 12.9 grams of protein, 121 calories, and 5.5 grams of fat. Beef contains more protein, with 23.5 grams in 100 grams of substance, but also has roughly three times the calories and four times the amount of fat as crickets do in 100 grams. Therefore, per 100 grams of substance, crickets contain only half the nutrients of beef, except for iron. High levels of iron are implicated in bowel cancer and heart disease. When considering the protein transition, cold-blooded insects can convert food more efficiently: crickets only need 2.1 kg feed for 1 kg 'meat', while poultry and cows need more than 2 times and 12 times of the feed, respectively.

==== Greenhouse gas emissions ====
The raising of livestock is responsible for 18% of all greenhouse gases emitted. Alternative sources of protein, such as insects, replace protein sourced from livestock and help decrease the amount of greenhouse gases emitted from food production. Insects produce less carbon dioxide, ammonia and methane than livestock such as pigs and cattle, with no farmed insect species besides cockroaches releasing methane at all.

==== Land usage ====
Livestock raising accounts for 70% of agricultural land use. This results in a land-cover change that destroys local ecosystems and displaces people and wildlife. Insect farming is minimally space-intensive compared to other conventional livestock, and can even take place in populated urban centers.

=== Challenges ===
==== Environmental issues ====
Insect production presents several unresolved environmental challenges. For instance, insect farms require consistent heating to maintain temperatures of around 25-30 °C, leading to significant energy consumption in Western countries.

Moreover, insects emit 5 to 13 times more greenhouse gases than soybean meal, even when fed organic waste. Recent studies have also indicated that the water usage for insect farming is higher per kilogram than that of pork, chicken, or beef, complicating the environmental benefits of this sector.

Additionally, many insect farms use high-quality agricultural by-products for feed, which puts them in competition with food sources for both humans and animals, potentially negating the positive environmental impact.

Finally, the use of insect-derived fertilizers and the risks associated with insects escaping into the wild remain sources of environmental concern.

==== Competitiveness issues ====
The insect-based protein industry has struggled to demonstrate positive economic outcome. The sector remains heavily reliant on public funding, with several commercial failures highlighting these challenges. For example, the Canadian company Aspire Food Group, which received over $35 million in public support, laid off 66% of its workforce in November 2024. Similarly, the French company Ynsect, despite securing €600 million in investment (half of which came from public funds), has been in judicial liquidation since December 2025.

Additionally, the cost of insect-based feed remains significantly higher than traditional alternatives, with prices estimated to be 2 to 10 times more expensive than conventional feeds like fish meal or soybean meal.

This economic vulnerability is further exacerbated in Europe, where the colder climate and higher labor costs reduce competitiveness compared to tropical regions like Southeast Asia, where insect farming benefits from more favorable temperatures (25-30 °C) for insect growth.

==== Acceptability issue ====
Difficulties in terms of consumer acceptability are also to be reported. A comprehensive review of 91 studies by Onwezen et al. found that insect-based proteins ranked lowest in acceptance among meat substitutes, below cultured meat, while plant-based options achieved the highest acceptance rates, reaching up to 91%.

== Insect welfare ==
There is uncertainty on whether insects are sentient and have the ability to feel pain.

One question is whether insects have the ability to sense noxious stimuli, known as nociception. According to Lars Chittka, "almost every time scientists search for insect nociception, they find it." Insects shown to have nociception include flies, bees and beetles.

Another question is whether these noxious stimuli can lead to a subjective experience of pain, notably when processed inside a brain. Scientists often look for behavioral cues, such as how animals react when injured. Research on insect sentience is relatively overlooked. Additionally, the findings may not generalize well, as some types of insects are more likely to exhibit sentience, or to a greater degree, than others.

According to Jonathan Birch, "If we're going to farm animals that are candidates for sentience, then there should be welfare standards". Professor Bob Fischer also argued that "If there are welfare concerns, you've got to intervene at the planning stages, when those facilities are being designed and constructed".

Relevant environmental factors include "temperature, moisture levels, lighting, how crowded the insects are, and what they eat."

== Processing methods ==
With the concern for pain tolerance in animal health and welfare, processing the insects can be mainly concluded as: harvesting and cleaning, inactivation, heating and drying, depending on the final product and rearing methods.

=== Harvesting and cleaning ===
Insects at different life stages can be collected by sieving followed by water cleaning when it is necessary to remove biomass or excretion. Before processing, the insects are sieved and stored alive at 4 °C for about one day without any feed.

=== Inactivation ===
An inactivation step is needed to inactivate any enzymes and microbes on the insects. The enzymatic browning reaction (mainly phenolase or phenol oxidase) can cause the brown or black color on the insect, which leads to discoloration and an off-flavor.

=== Heat-treatment ===
Sufficient heat treatment is required to kill enterobacteriaceae so that the product can meet safety requirements. D-value and Z-value can be used to estimate the effectiveness of heat treatments. The temperature and duration of the heating will cause insect proteins' denaturation and changes the functional properties of proteins.

=== Drying ===
To prevent spoilage, the products are dried to lower moisture content and prolong shelf life. Longer drying time results from a low evaporation rate due to the chitin layer, which can prevent the insects from dehydrating during their lifetime. So the product being in granule form gives the advantage of further drying. In general, insects have a moisture level in the range of 55-65%. A drying process decreasing the moisture content to a level of <10% is good for preservation.

Besides the moisture level, oxidation of lipids can cause high levels of unsaturated fatty acids. Hence the processing steps influencing the final fat stability in products are necessary to be considered during drying.

== Regulations in Europe ==
The use of insect meal as feed and food is limited by legislation. Insects can be used in novel food according to the European Union guidelines for market authorization of products. The European Union Commission accepted the use of insects for fish feed in July 2017. However, the power to promote the scale-up of insect production becomes difficult when few participate in this market to change the rules. In Europe, safety documents for certain insects and accompanying products are required by the European Union (EFSA) and NVWA.

== See also ==
- Entomophagy
- Insects as food
- Entomophagy in humans
- Butterfly ranching in Papua New Guinea
- Insect Farming and Trading Agency
- Welfare of farmed insects
- Cricket flour
- Maggot farming
