= Crickstart Food =

Canadian organization

Crickstart Food Co.
- Company type: Private
- Industry: food processing, insect food
- Founded: 2016
- Headquarters: Montreal, Quebec, Canada
- Key people: Daniel Novak, Michael Badea (Co-Founders)
- Website: www.crickstart.com www.crickstart.ca

Crickstart Food Co. is a Canadian insect food company that produces organic cricket-based food products, headquartered in Montreal, Quebec.

== Company History ==
Crickstart was founded in 2016. In May 2018 Crickstart launched its products in the US market while at the Sweets & Snacks Expo in Chicago.

== Products ==
The company produces energy and protein bars made with cricket flour.

== Reception ==
In a review of the Crickstart cinnamon cardamom bar for La Presse, food reviewer Marie Allard highlighted its "quality ingredients" such as hemp, seed butters, dates, and coconut sugar, citing that the bar provides "260 calories, 16 g of fat, 10 g of sugar, and 12 g of protein".

In an article for the Globe and Mail, journalist Corey Mintz mentions Crickstart as one of the companies that are "lining up to sell insects [...] as an environmentally friendly cure-all". However, the article argues that the "solution narrative – the marketing of insects as a panacea for health, resource and climate challenges – is misleading". However, CEO Daniel Novak explained to Mintz that "other agricultural industries are heavily automated and apply massive economies of scale… As people purchase these products, production volumes increase and new entrants come into the industry, prices will be driven down over the coming years".
