= Commercial butterfly breeding =

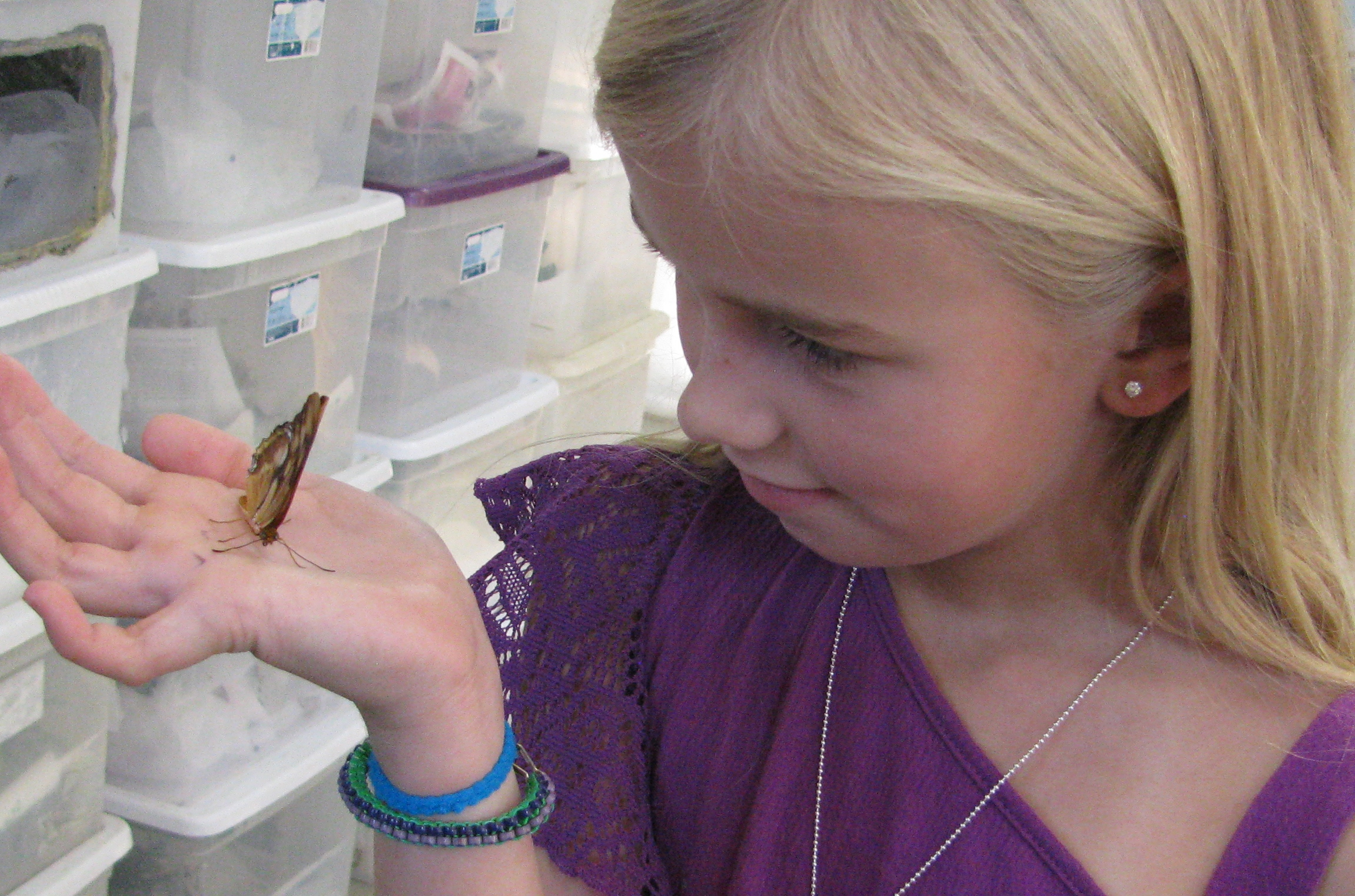
Captive bred butterflies are used in the classroom

Commercial butterfly breeding or captive butterfly breeding is the practice of breeding butterflies and moths in controlled environments to supply the stock to research facilities, universities, zoos, insectariums, elementary and secondary schools, butterfly exhibits, conservation organizations, nature centers, individuals, and other commercial facilities. Some butterfly and moth breeders limit their market to wholesale customers while other breeders supply smaller volumes of stock as a retail activity. Some small scale and larger scale breeders limit their businesses to the provision of butterflies or moths for schools. Others provide butterflies to be used and released in commemorative events. The release usually occurs in the natural range of the butterfly.

== History ==
=== 5000 BC to 1976 ===
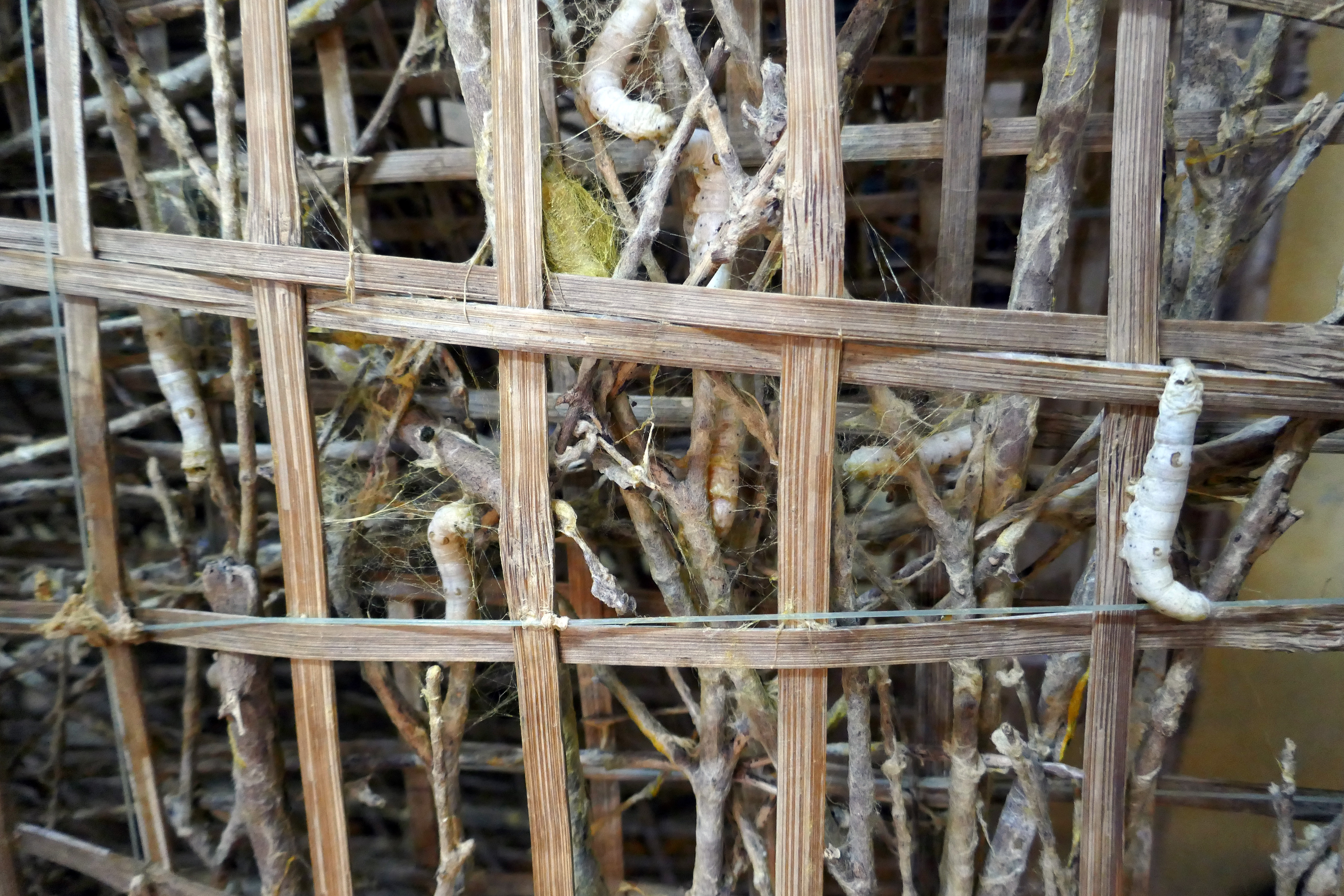
Sericulture in Hoi An, Vietnam

Commercial breeding of Lepidoptera has a long history. Rearing of silkworms (Bombyx mori) on mulberry trees for the production of raw silk, also known as sericulture, has been underway for at least 5,000 years in China. It is dependent on humans for its reproduction and does not occur naturally in the wild. The silkworm was domesticated from the wild silkmoth Bombyx mandarina, which ranges from northern India to northern China, Korea, Japan, and the far eastern regions of Russia. The domesticated silkworm derives from Chinese rather than Japanese or Korean stock. Silkworms were unlikely to have been domestically bred before the Neolithic age; before then, the tools required to facilitate the manufacturing of larger quantities of silk thread had not been developed. The domesticated B. mori and the wild B. mandarina can still breed and sometimes produce hybrids.

=== 1977–present ===
Serious commercial breeding activity began in 1977. At this time, the tomato industry on Guernsey had become bankrupt and unused greenhouses remained. An entrepreneur purchased a vacant greenhouse and filled it with tropical plants – creating a tropical jungle environment. Butterflies from Asia were acquired and set free within the enclosure. The newly constructed enclosure contained a waterfall and a small stream. The structure was then opened to the public. In 1977, there was no access to commercial butterfly breeders in tropical regions, so the stock was obtained from amateur lepidopterists who periodically provided a few dozen butterflies to the exhibit. The Guernsey butterfly exhibit was a commercial success. Butterfly exhibits quickly gained a positive reputation with investors. They were seen as novel commercial activities generating a return in a short time.

The butterfly exhibit industry continued to expand in 1980 and until 1988 in the United Kingdom. New exhibits were started every year. Some were separate exhibits, while others were part of wealthy estates. Other commercial exhibits were added onto already existing businesses, such as garden supply centers.

The new butterfly exhibits had varying results. Some exhibits were not as labor-intensive and were started hastily in order to maximize short-term profit. One owner pinned his dead butterflies onto flowers to cut costs. Other exhibitors sought to improve their exhibits to increase the public's enjoyment. These developed exhibits began to set long-term profit goals. Commercial butterfly breeding and exhibitions have developed rapidly over the past 20 years, putting unprofitable exhibitors out of business.

European butterfly exhibits are now supplied by regulated butterfly brokers. In 1980 one full-time professional distributor supplied live butterfly stock - Entomological Livestock Supplies. Other suppliers have formed since then. Brokers import butterfly pupae from around the world. Leading producers of butterfly pupae are the United States, El Salvador, Suriname, Ecuador, Malaysia, Kenya, Philippines, Thailand, and Costa Rica.

Butterfly exhibits and commercial/captive breeding have flourished in Canada and the United States. North America's largest butterfly exhibit is The Niagara Parks Butterfly Conservatory. It opened in 1996 and is a $15 million facility. The conservatory can accommodate up to 300 visitors per hour. The glass dome that contains the conservatory is 1,022 square meters (11,000 sq ft) in size with 180 meters (590 ft) of paths inside the greenhouse.

== Breeding Practices and Procedure ==
Some breeders are able to generate substantial income. Large operations require large, paid, and trained staff.

=== Training and Certification ===
Commercial and captive breeders often begin their operations after raising butterflies as a hobby and then expanding this into a business. Many butterfly breeders consider themselves to be hobbyists and limit their breeding to providing butterflies to their friends, families, and schools at no cost.

Commercial and hobbyist breeders are often members of the International Butterfly Breeders Association (IBBA) and the Association for Butterflies (AFB).

A breeder typically begins their operation by obtaining breeding stock from a reputable supplier of healthy stock screened for the disease. Most breeders in southern states are able to overwinter their stock enabling them to provide butterflies to customers year-round if the ambient temperatures are supportive of flight and the survival of the butterfly. Many breeders in northern latitudes that experience cold winters or repeated frosts shut down for the winter months.

Breeders are trained in infection control, health monitoring, disease prevention, laboratory techniques, and biological pest control.

=== Methods ===
Captive breeders employ cost-effective and sustainable methods of plant propagation needed to provide larval food for their stock. Greenhouses, hydroponics, drip irrigation, and organic-based methods control disease costs and create high plant yields. Pesticides are not used in the breeding of stock.

Captive breeders reduce the exposure of laboratory-bred stock to naturally occurring predators, parasites, and diseases that affect wild stock by rearing butterflies in enclosed environments.

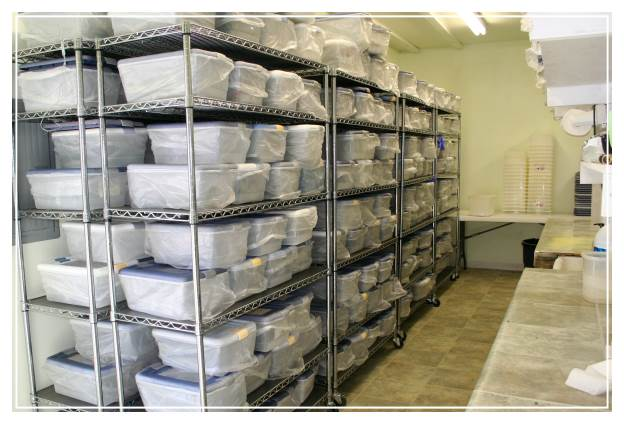
larva room

The butterfly and moth larvae are typically raised in containers in various densities dependent upon the predetermined protocols. Some butterfly larvae are best raised in lower densities and others at higher densities. Breeding operations can include other environmental controls such as humidity and temperature.

Larger breeding operations require hiring employees who are then trained to grow larval food maintain the grounds, sustain controlled environments, make shipments, advise receiving organizations on the proper care of butterfly stock.

=== Host plants ===
Breeders grow host plants for the larvae that they are raising. Many of them have greenhouses enclosed to protect the food plants from being contaminated by parasites, predators, and adverse environmental conditions. The plants raised in these greenhouses grow faster and stronger due to the methods employed by the breeders.

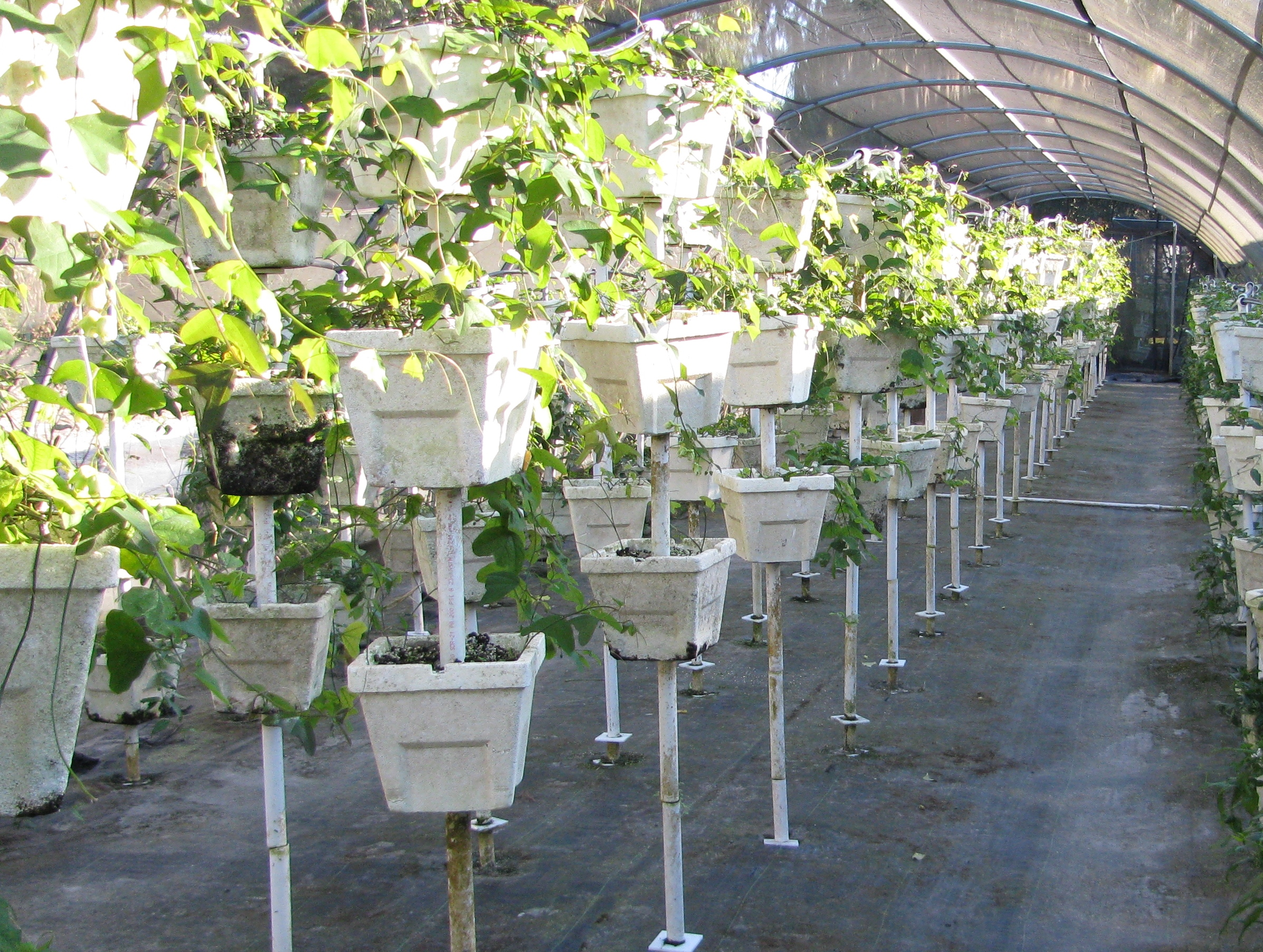
Hydroponic growing of larval food plants

Different species of butterflies need different host plants. Some larvae are limited to one type of host plant while other larvae are referred to as generalists and are able to use a variety of host plants.

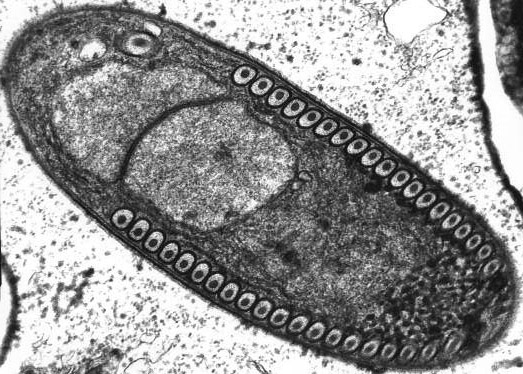
microsporidium spore

Proper care for the host plants is important to ensure a large and healthy stock. Microsporidium, a fungal parasite that originates from host plants, can kill 100% of larvae hatched from infected eggs. This disease is transferred from larvae to adults. Infected larvae initially show no visible symptoms. This infection is detected with a microscope.

== National Regulation (US) ==
The United States Department of Agriculture (USDA) regulates the interstate shipment of captive/commercially bred butterflies. The USDA allows shipments to areas and regions within the natural range of the butterfly. Some states have their own regulations to govern the shipping and release of commercially bred stock. Canada also regulates the shipment of butterflies. The United States Department of Agriculture does not regulate butterfly releases and breeding done within the boundaries of a state.

Butterflies, moths, and almost all other species of animals and plants are not allowed to be removed from federal land and are not considered a source of butterflies for release. Fines are applied to those who collect from federal lands.

Only six species of butterflies can be shipped across state lines in the United States. Butterfly houses, conservatories, and exhibits can receive butterflies and moths from outside of the United States. These shipments are regulated and do not allow the release of butterflies from these controlled environments. The shipments are also regulated by the United States Department of Agriculture. These same operations do receive shipments of native butterflies from breeders within the United States who have the proper permits.

== Commercial Activity ==
Market-driven competition determines the price of butterflies supplied to customers and wholesalers. Some commercial breeders limit their shipments to wholesale customers like butterfly houses, conservatories, and exhibits. Other breeders shipped directly to customers who use the butterflies in various venues.

Breeders ship stock in all ages of the life cycle of the butterfly to elementary and secondary schools throughout the United States, subject to the shipping regulations of the USDA.

Event organizers sometimes purchase butterflies from breeders to be released during events such as funerals, hospice activities, bar mitzvahs, 9/11 memorial events, and weddings.

Captive-bred stock is purchased by researchers.

Captive butterfly breeding has been used to replenish extirpated populations of butterflies. An example of this was the commercial breeding of the Schaus' Swallowtail, also known as Papilio aristodemus. This species of butterfly is native to the Florida Keys and in 2012, there were only four left in the wild. Their population has been successfully restored since then by captive butterfly breeders at the University of Florida. The breeding program produced more than a thousand larvae within two years.

== International economic impact ==
Butterfly farming has been successful in increasing economic opportunities for local people in Ecuador and Costa Rica. Butterfly farming also promotes conservation activities and education.

Commercial butterfly breeding in developing countries is a practical and sustainable field. It is environmentally non-destructive, uses available raw materials, economically and environmentally sustainable. Commercial butterfly breeding can be considered ethical because it does not harm or degrade the people involved in it or the environment that sustains it.

In contrast to the clearcutting of natural habitats, a butterfly farming operation is dependent upon native plant species. A butterfly farmer keeps areas of land intact with naturally occurring vegetation. Commercial butterfly farmers plant native plants on the property, providing food sources for the caterpillars.

Commercial butterfly breeders generate employment and support the rural economy. It inhibits rural to urban movement patterns.

Some national governments in these countries have established protections for the maintenance of butterfly ranching. In Papua New Guinea, the Insect Farming and Trading Agency oversees and regulates sustainable butterfly ranching. Commercially bred monarchs migrate to overwintering sites in Mexico, expanding the knowledge of migratory behavior.

== Potential Risks ==
Some are concerned with the possible negative effects of captive breeding.

=== Reduction of biodiversity ===
Commercial and captive breeding releases of painted lady and monarch butterflies have been criticized for their potential of reducing biodiversity in wild populations. The homogeneity of the genome of the monarch has been determined and is 'unprecedented' across its worldwide range.

This is why a recent major goal of captive breeding programs is the preservation of maximum genetic variability within a species. Sampling butterflies from several genetic lineages can help promote biodiversity within captive bred groups.

=== Disease and parasite transmission ===
Butterfly releases have been criticized for having the potential of spreading disease and promoting the proliferation of more virulent strains of parasites.

Parasitic strains of Ophryocystis elektroscirrha have been found to be the most virulent in the western population of the monarch butterfly. When monarchs in the eastern population were inoculated with the parasite found in the western population, the eastern monarchs were more resistant to the parasite than western monarchs. When monarchs from the western population were inoculated with the parasite found on eastern monarchs, no significant differences were observed. The degree of variation can be attributed to different variations in the host and parasitic conditions.

=== Overutilization ===
Butterfly releases have been criticized because the monarch butterfly population is being overutilized.

Breeders often use wild monarch butterflies to initiate their seasonal breeding. The released butterflies add to the population of wild monarchs.

=== Petition to have the monarch butterfly designated as threatened under the Endangered Species Act ===
Adoption of the designation to have the monarch butterfly as threatened would prohibit the release of commercially bred monarchs, subject to substantial fines and penalties.
