= Stratford Butterfly Farm =

UK visitor attraction

Coordinates: 52.18957°N 1.70030°W

- Interactive map of Stratford Butterfly Farm
- Date opened: 1985
- Location: Tramway Walk, Stratford-upon-Avon, Warwickshire, England
- Website: Official website

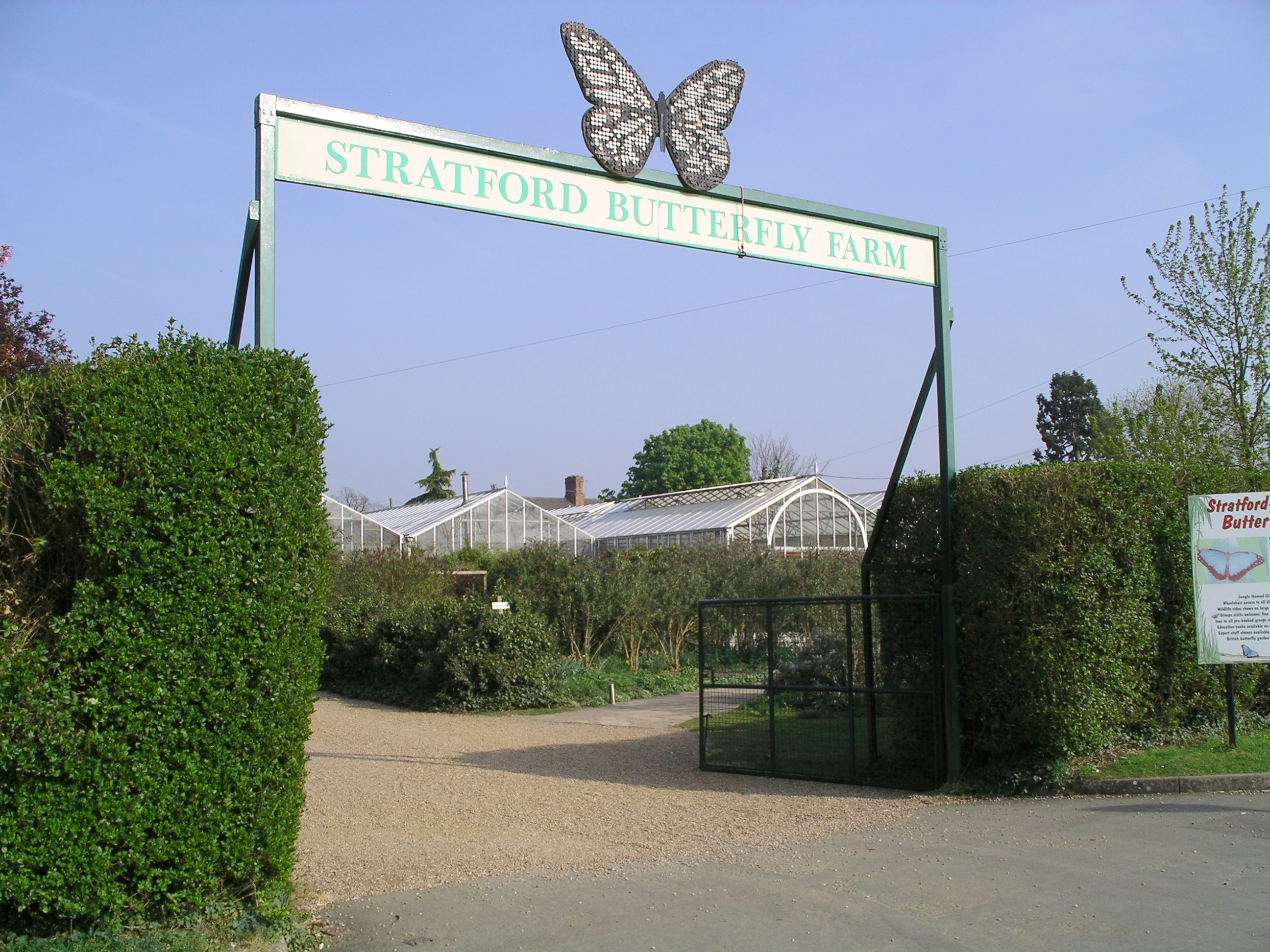
The main gates to Stratford Butterfly Farm

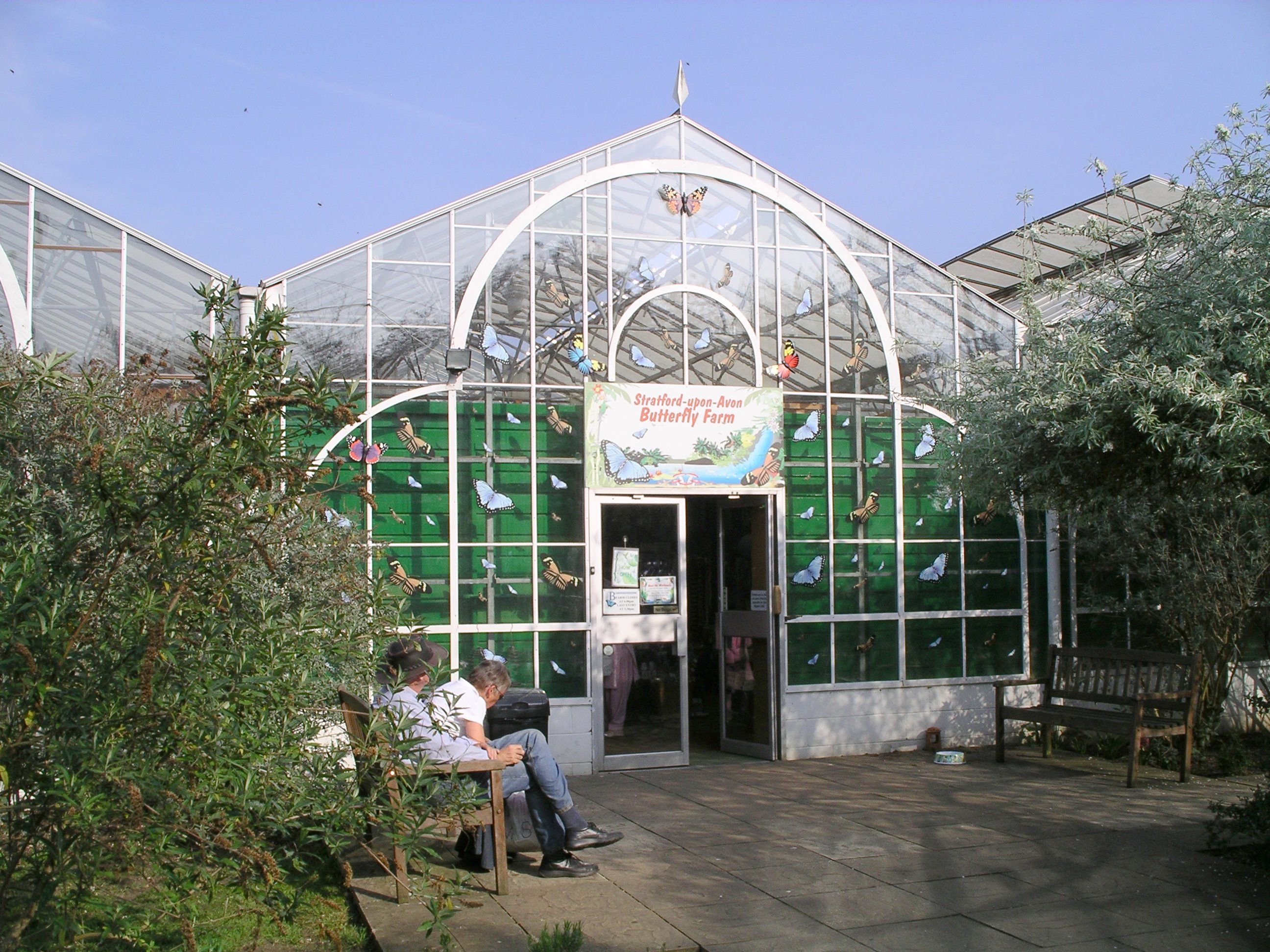
The entrance to the shop and greenhouses

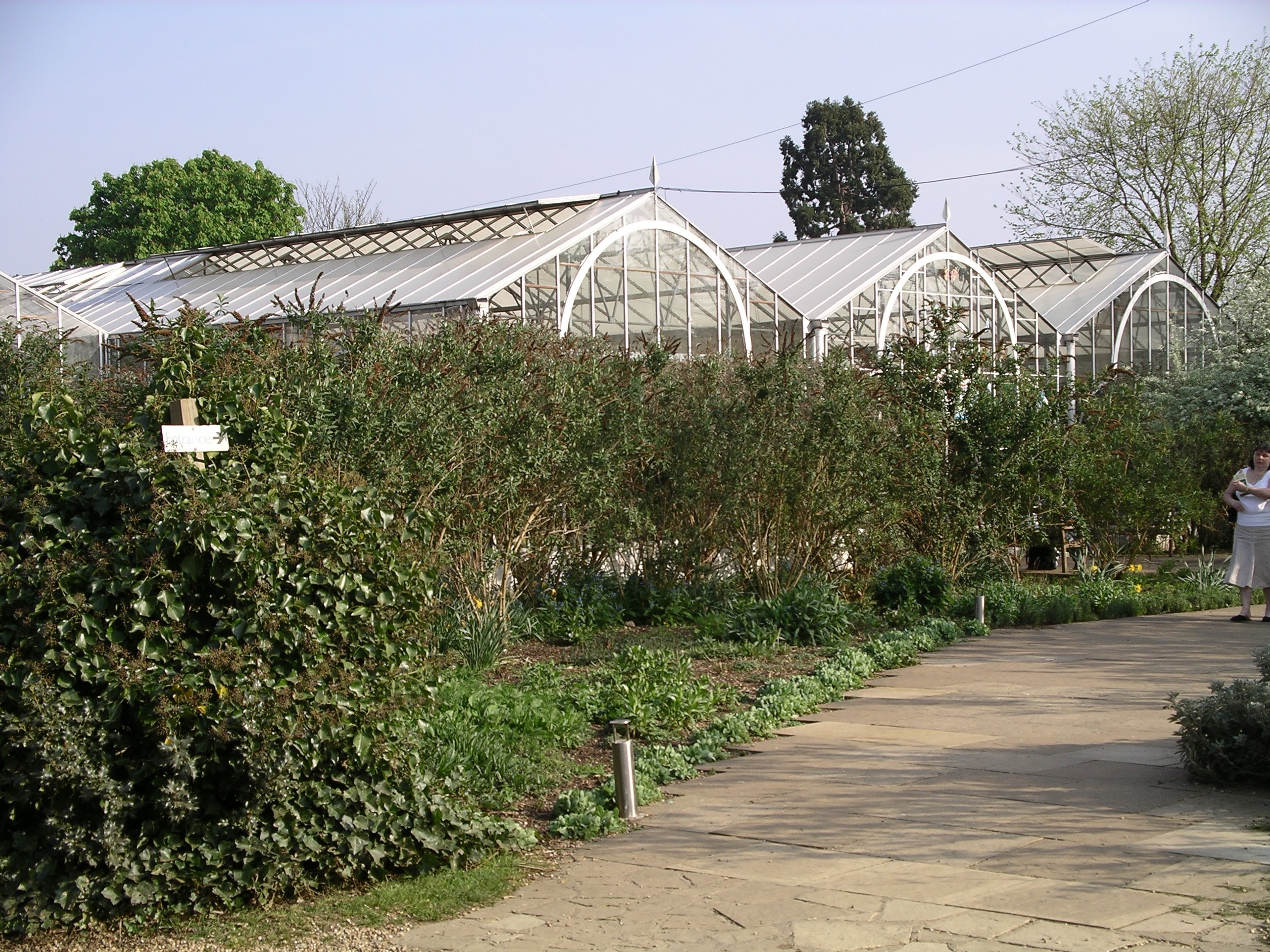
Green houses

Stratford Butterfly Farm is a visitor attraction in Stratford-upon-Avon, Warwickshire, England. A leafy tropical environment is simulated inside large greenhouses. There are numerous free flying butterflies, a pool containing fish, a group of 22 phantasmal poison frogs, two green iguanas, and running water. There are also insects and spiders living in glass displays.

== Design ==
Stratford Butterfly Farm consists of four main areas:

- Flight Area, where there are approximately 1,800 free flying tropical butterflies in a rainforest environment of plants, flowers, waterfalls and fish.
- Discovery Zone, which houses caterpillars, pupae, eggs and specialist plants for butterfly breeding.
- Minibeast Metropolis, which houses more exotic insects, such as beetles, stick insects, spiders and leafcutter ants.
- Rainforest Realm, which houses a green tree python and a rhinoceros rat snake. They also have a spectacled caiman that lives in its own cenote.

== History ==
Stratford Butterfly Farm was opened by David Bellamy in 1985 and it celebrated its 25th anniversary on 24 July 2010.

On 3 June 2002, part of a glass butterfly nursery that was used for breeding rare and exotic butterflies was destroyed in a fire. A firework from a jubilee firework display is thought to have landed in an empty plastic flower pot next to the greenhouse and started the fire. About 90 exotic butterflies were in the nursery at the time and the majority were saved; however, special exotic plants that were used for butterfly breeding were destroyed by the fire.
