= Butterfly ranching in Papua New Guinea =

Butterfly ranching in Papua New Guinea is a method for sustainable use of insect biodiversity endorsed and supported by the national government. The trade is controlled by the Insect Farming and Trading Agency, an organ of the Papua New Guinea government. Papua New Guinea has a spectacular butterfly fauna, including the world's largest butterflies, the Queen Alexandra's birdwing (Ornithoptera alexandrae) and the Goliath birdwing (Ornithoptera goliath). A mosaic gynandromorphic specimen of the Goliath birdwing was sold by a Taiwanese dealer for US$28,000 in July 2006, which is possibly the world record for the highest price paid for a butterfly. Prior to the establishment of the government legislation, the butterfly trade depended upon expatriate dealers who traded in wild-caught specimens. A Food and Agriculture Organization project in the early seventies aided the government in adopting this eco-friendly utilisation scheme.

The IFTA promotes the ecologically sound and sustainable practice of butterfly ranching where free ranging butterflies lay their eggs on food plants specifically grown for this purpose. Eggs, larvae and pupae are protected and allowed to grow safely to adult stage. A portion of the newly hatched adults are harvested for the insect trade while the rest are released to complement the free-ranging population.

== See also ==
- Insect farming
- Insect Farming and Trading Agency

== Online resources ==
- Insect Farming and Trading Agency—
