= Insects as food =

Use of insects as food for humans

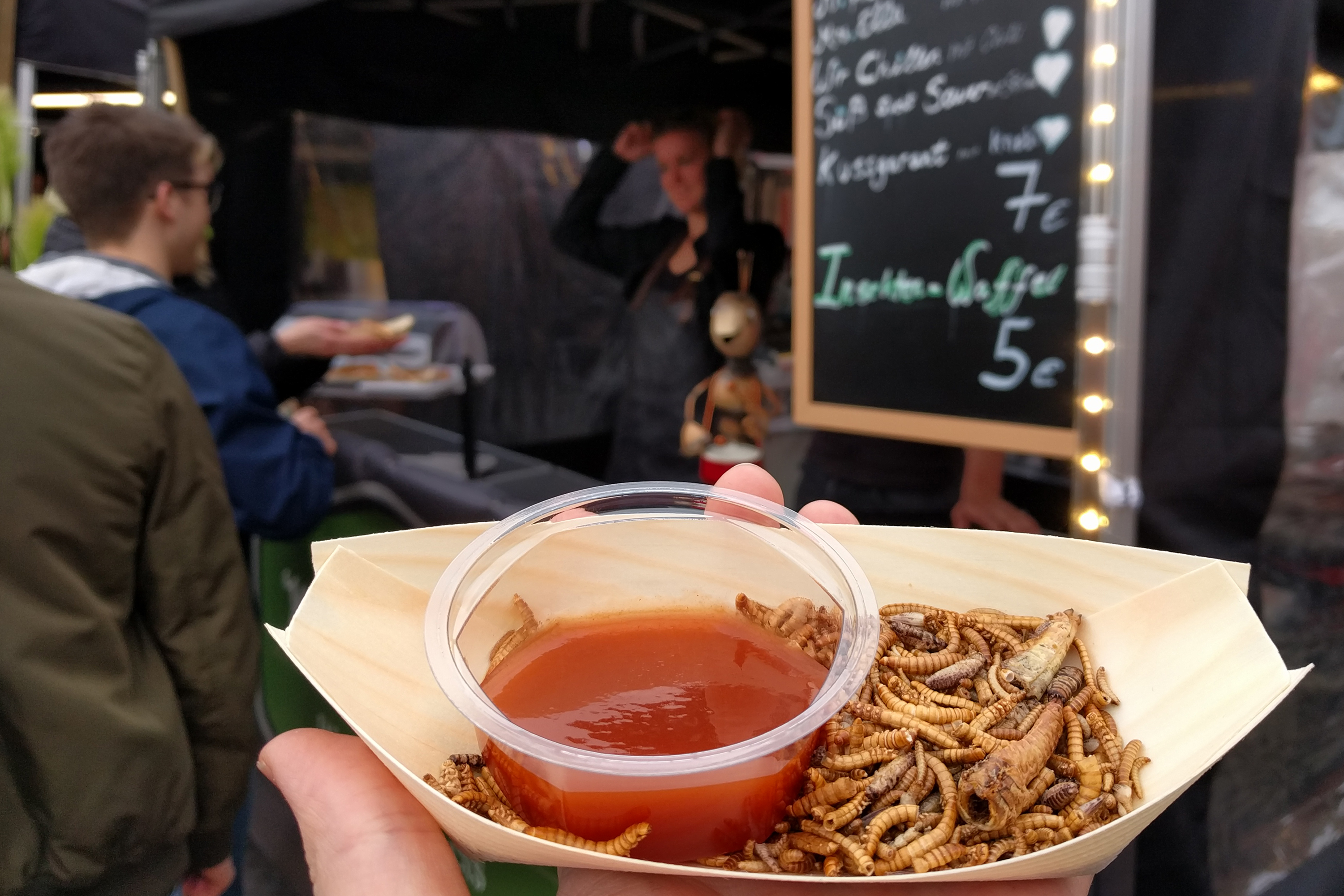
Whole, fried edible insects as street food in Germany

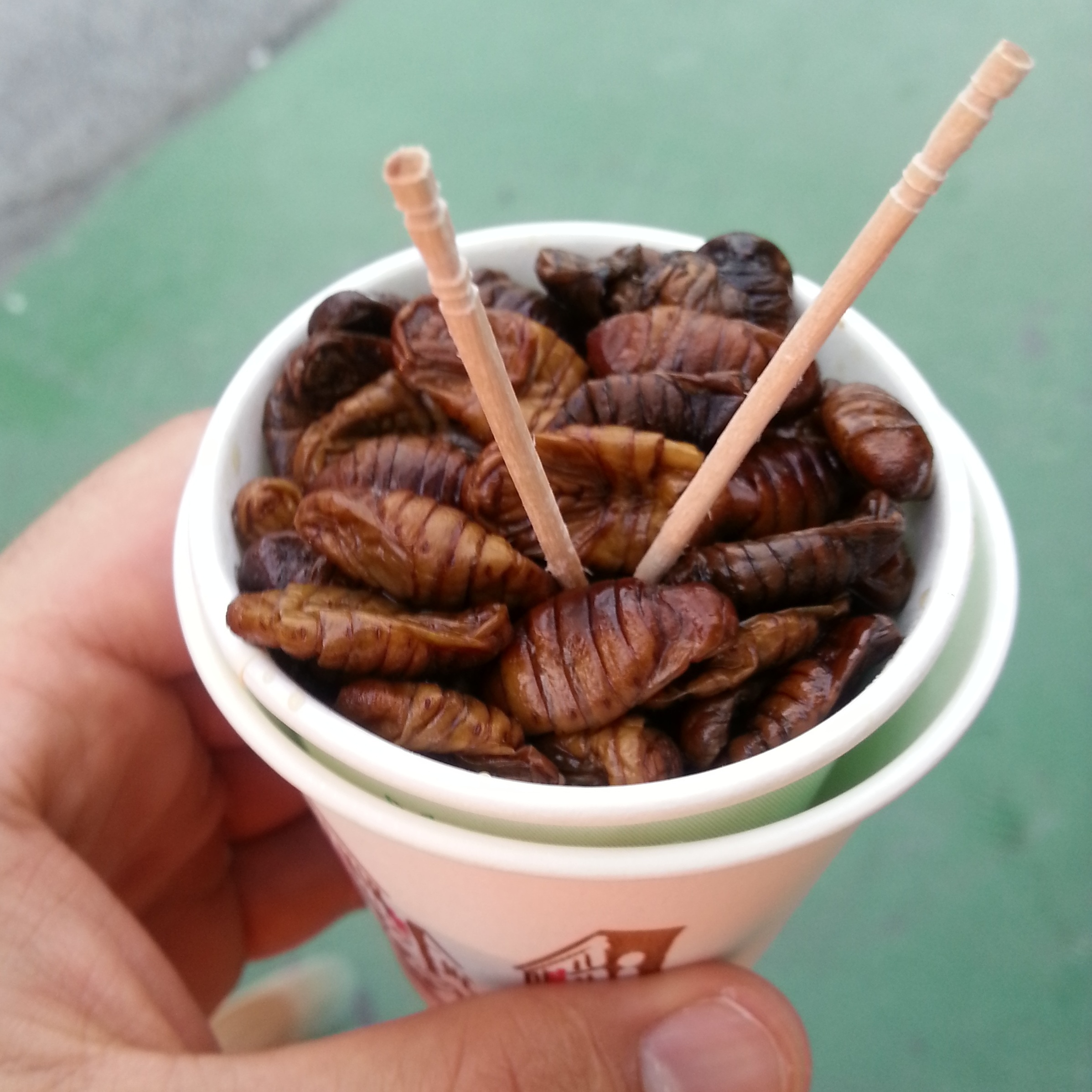
Whole, steamed silkworm pupae as street food in South Korea (beondegi)

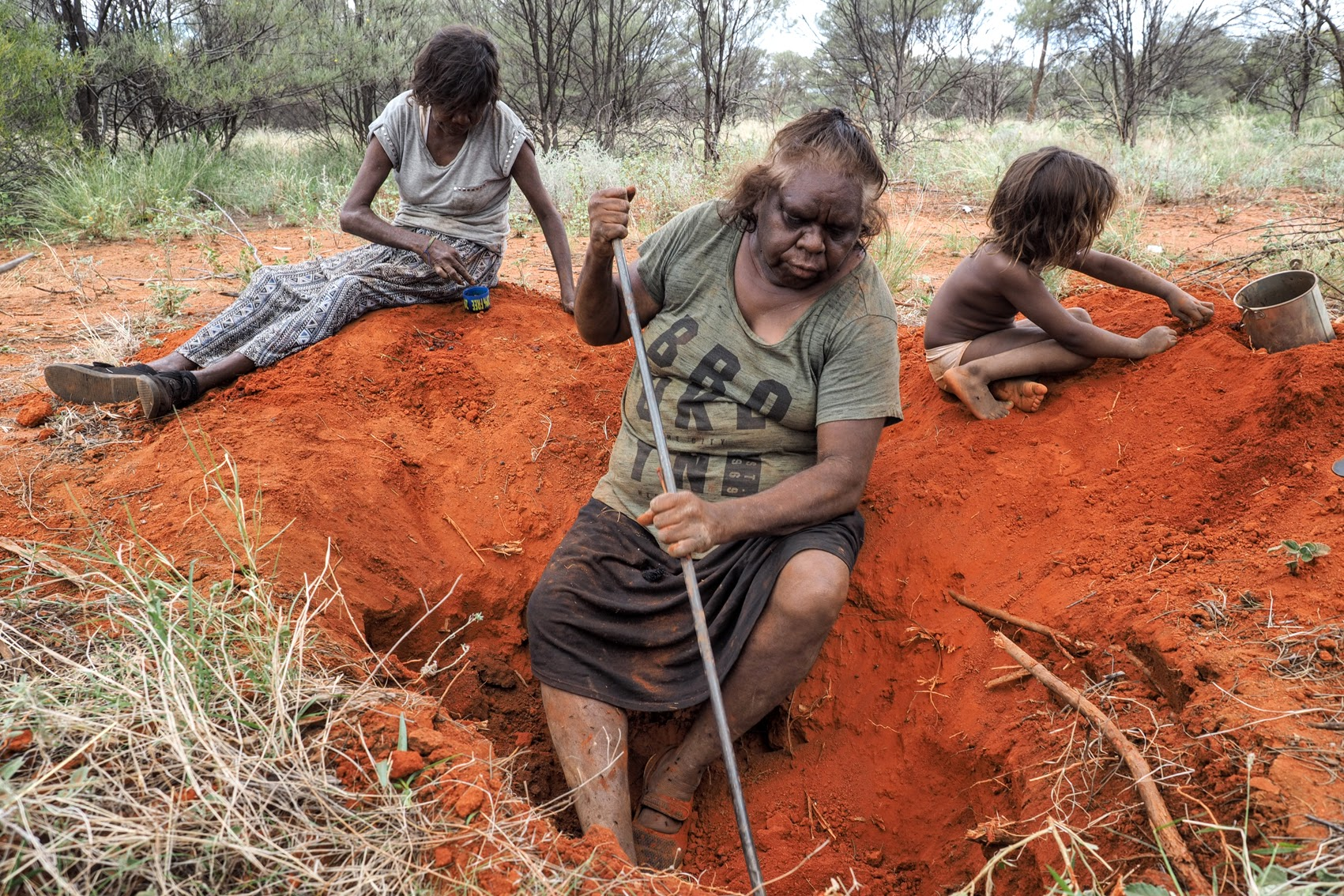
Digging for Honeypot ants in Australia

Insects as food or edible insects are insect species used for human consumption. Over 2 billion people are estimated to eat insects on a daily basis. Globally, more than 2,000 insect species are considered edible, though far fewer are discussed for industrialized mass production and regionally authorized for use in food. Many insects are highly nutritious, though nutritional content depends on species and other factors such as diet and age. Insects offer a wide variety of flavors and are commonly consumed whole or pulverized for use in dishes and processed food products such as burger patties, pasta, or snacks. Like other foods, there can be risks associated with consuming insects, such as allergic reactions. As commercial interest in insects as food grows, countries are introducing new regulatory frameworks to oversee their production, processing, marketing, and consumption.

== Edible insects ==
=== Frequently consumed insect species ===
Human consumption of 2,205 different insect species has been documented.

The table below ranks insect order by number and percentage of confirmed species consumed and presents each insect orders' percentage of known insect species diversity. With the exceptions of orders Orthoptera and Diptera, there is close alignment between species diversity and consumption, suggesting that humans tend to eat those insects that are most available.

Human insect consumption by taxonomic order
Insect order	Common name	No. of confirmed eaten spp.	% of insect spp. eaten	% of total insect spp.
Coleoptera	Beetles	705	33	32
Hymenoptera	Bees, wasps, ants	341	15	15.5
Lepidoptera	Butterflies, moths	335	17	15.2
Orthoptera	Grasshoppers, locusts, crickets	310	13	14.1
Hemiptera	True bugs, inc. cicadas	251	11	11.4
Isoptera	Termites	76		3.4
Odonata	Dragonflies	54	3	2.4
Diptera	Flies	39		1.8
Ephemeroptera	Mayflies	11		1.7
Plecoptera	Stoneflies	9		0.4
Trichoptera	Caddisflies	8		0.4
Phasmida	Walking Sticks	7		0.3
Megaloptera	Alderflies, dobsonflies, fishflies	4		0.2
Psocoptera	Booklice	1		0.05
Dermaptera	Earwigs	1		0.05

=== Geography of insect consumption ===
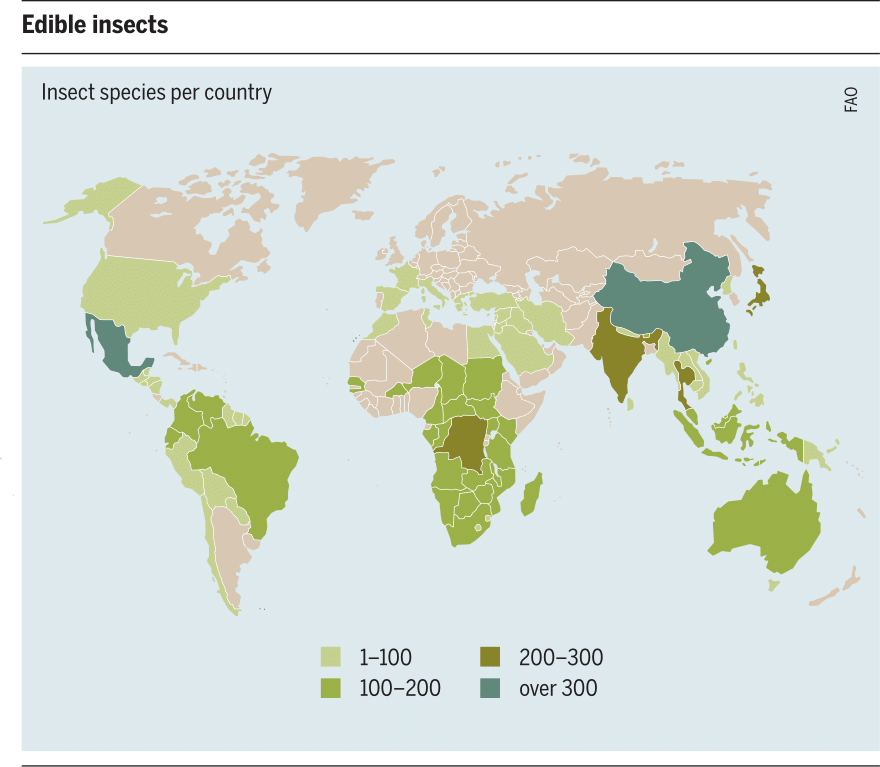
Number of edible insect species per country

Insect species consumption varies by region due to differences in environment, ecosystems, and climate. The number of insect species consumed by country is highest in equatorial and sub-tropical regions, a reflection of greater insect abundance and biodiversity observed at lower latitudes and their year-round availability.

=== Edible insects for industrialized mass production ===
To increase consumer interest in Western markets such as Europe and North America, insects have been processed into a non‐recognizable form, such as powders or flour. Policymakers, academics, as well as large-scale insect food producers such as Entomofarms in Canada, Aspire Food Group in the United States, Protifarm and Protix in the Netherlands, and Bühler Group in Switzerland, focus on seven insect species suitable for human consumption as well as industrialized mass production:

- Mealworms (Tenebrio molitor) as larvae
- Lesser mealworms (Alphitobius diaperinus) as larvae, mostly marketed under the term buffalo worms.
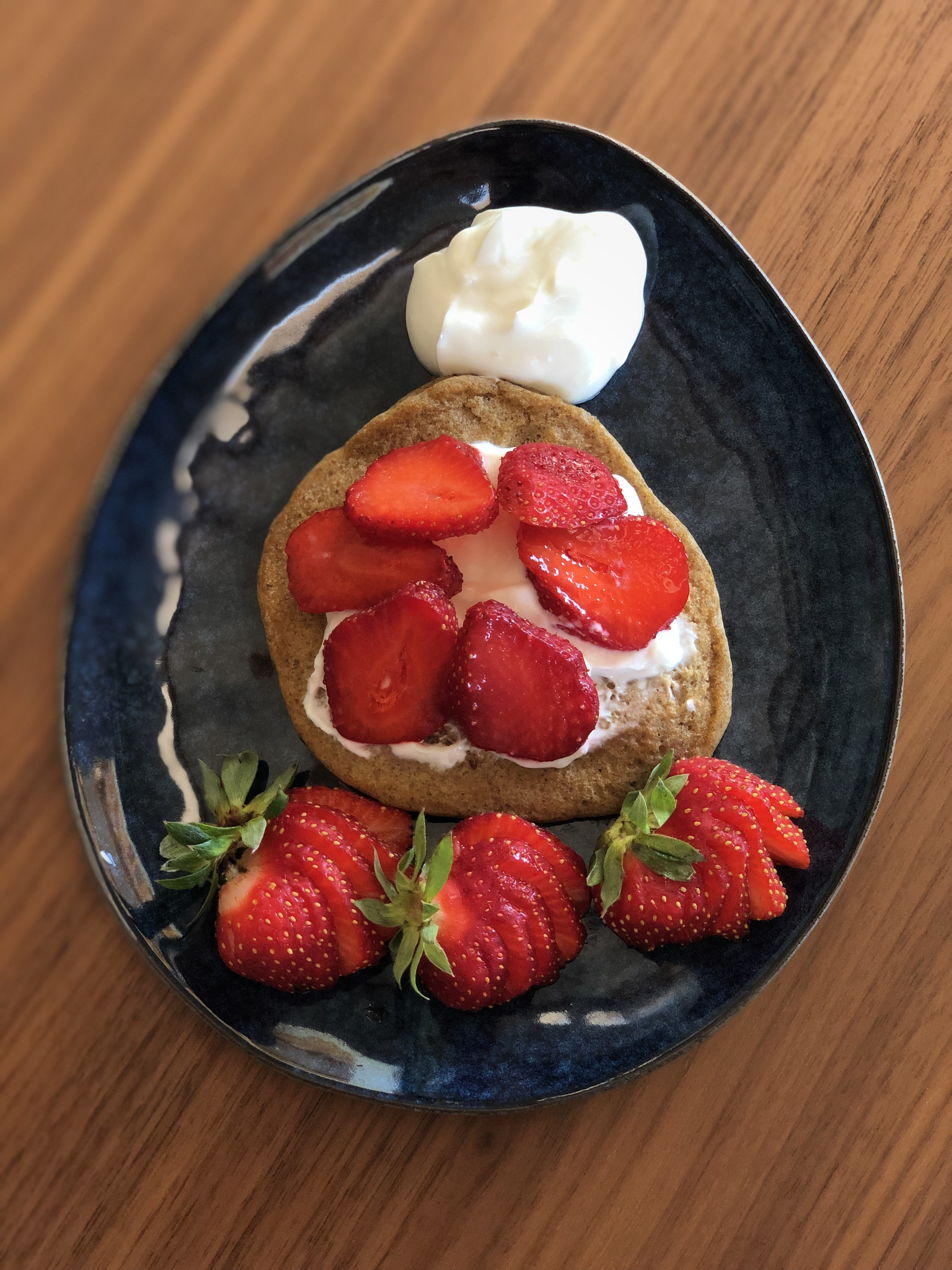
  Pancakes made from insect powder, served with strawberries and skyr
- House cricket (Acheta domesticus)
- Tropical house cricket (Gryllodes sigillatus)
- European migratory locust (Locusta migratoria)
- Black soldier fly (Hermetia illucens)
- Housefly (Musca domestica)

Cochineal (Dactylopius coccus) is collected to produce carmine, a red dye used for textiles and food. It was largely substituted with synthetic dyes like alizarin. Fears over the safety of artificial food additives renewed the popularity of cochineal dyes, and the increased demand has made cultivation of the insect profitable again, with Peru being the largest producer, followed by Mexico, Chile, Argentina and the Canary Islands.

Insects as food or food ingredients

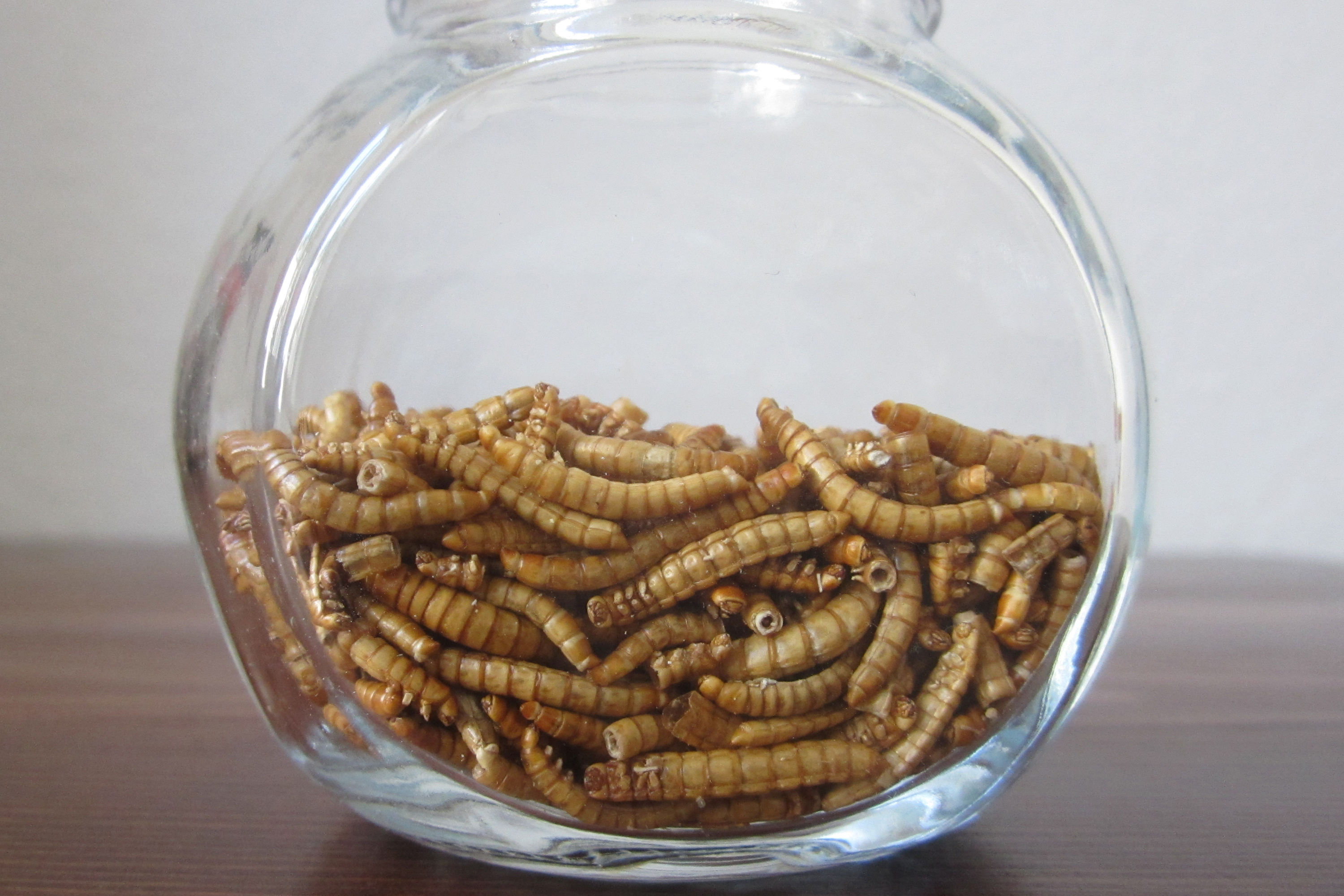
Freeze-dried mealworms

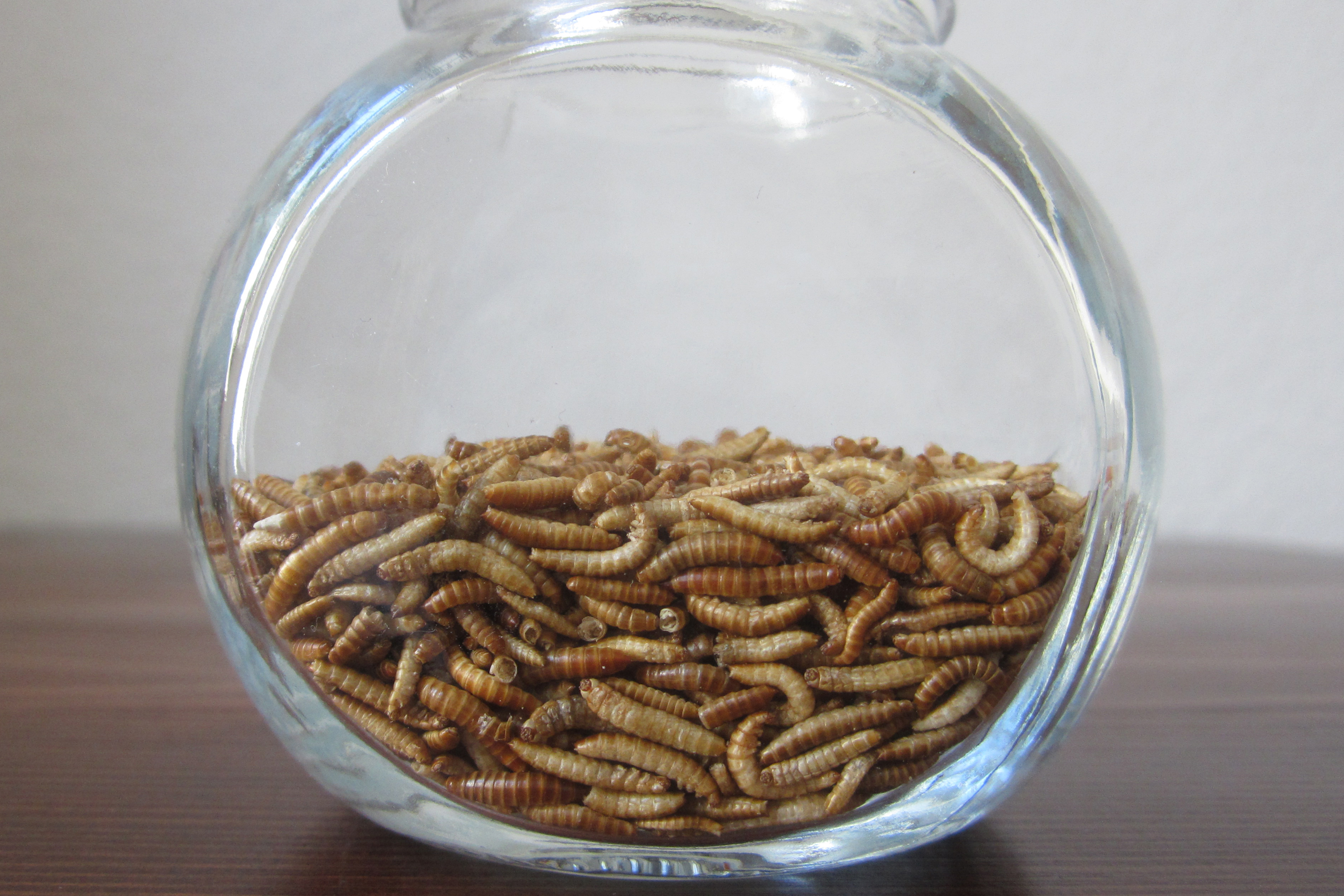
Buffalo worms

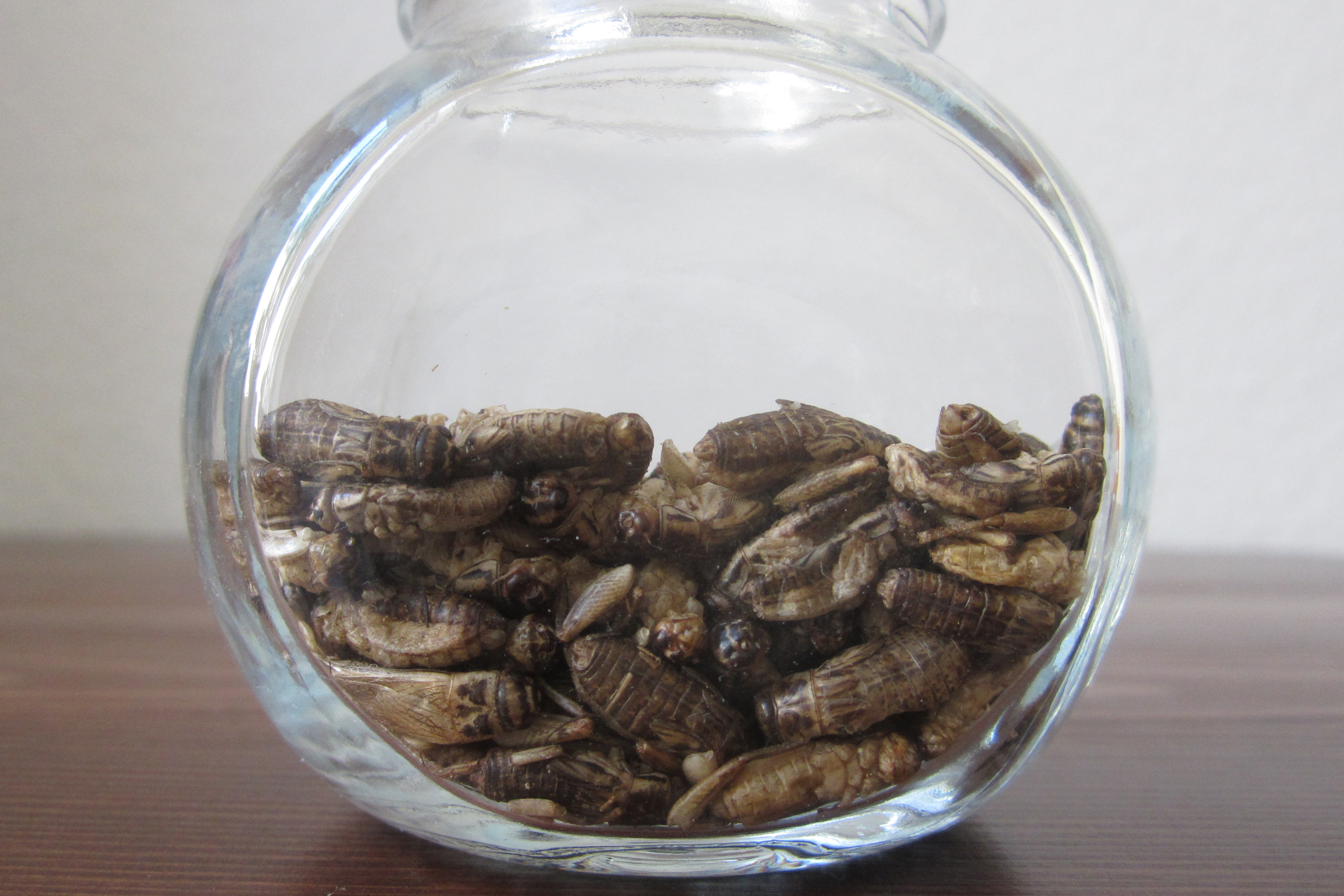
House crickets

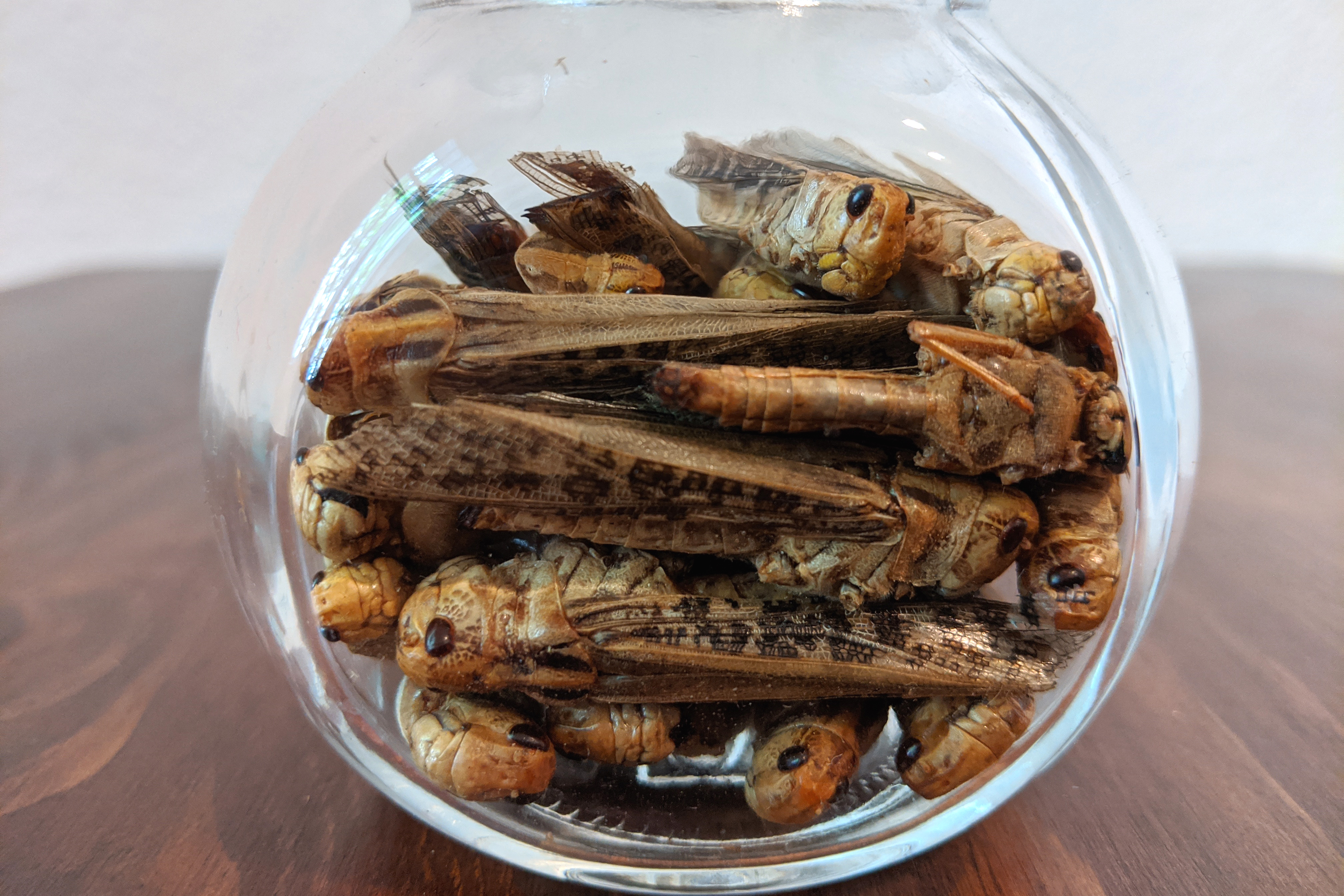
Migratory locusts

== Nutritional profile ==
The nutritional profiles of edible insects are highly variable given the large number of species consumed. In addition to species differences, nutritional content can be affected by geographic origin and production method (wild or farmed), diet, age, development stage, and sex. For instance, female house crickets (Acheta domestica) contain more fat than males, while males contain more protein than females.

Some insects (e.g. crickets, mealworms) are a source of complete protein and provide similar essential amino acid levels as soybeans, though less than casein. They have dietary fiber, essential minerals, vitamins such as B12, riboflavin and vitamin A, and include mostly unsaturated fat.

Locusts contain between 8 and 20 milligrams of iron for every 100 grams of raw locust, whereas beef contains roughly 6 milligrams of iron in the same amount of meat. Crickets are also very efficient in terms of nutrients. For every 100 grams of substance crickets contain 12.9 grams of protein, 121 calories, and 5.5 grams of fat. Beef contains more protein, containing 23.5 grams in 100 grams of substance, but also has roughly triple the calories and four times the amount of fat as crickets do in 100 grams.

Nutritional value per 100 g	Mealworms (Tenebrio molitor)	Buffalo worms (Alphitobius diaperinus)	House crickets (Acheta domesticus)	Migratory locust (Locusta migratoria)
Energy	550 kcal / 2303 kJ	484 kcal / 2027 kJ	458 kcal / 1918 kJ	559 kcal / 2341 kJ
Fat; Of which saturated fatty acids	37,2 g 9 g	24,7 g 8 g	18,5 g 7 g	38,1 g 13,1 g
Carbohydrates; Of which sugars	5,4 g 0 g	6,7 g 0 g	0 g 0 g	1,1 g 0 g
Protein	45,1 g	56,2 g	69,1 g	48,2 g
Salt	0,37 g	0,38 g	1,03 g	0,43 g

== Organoleptic characteristics ==
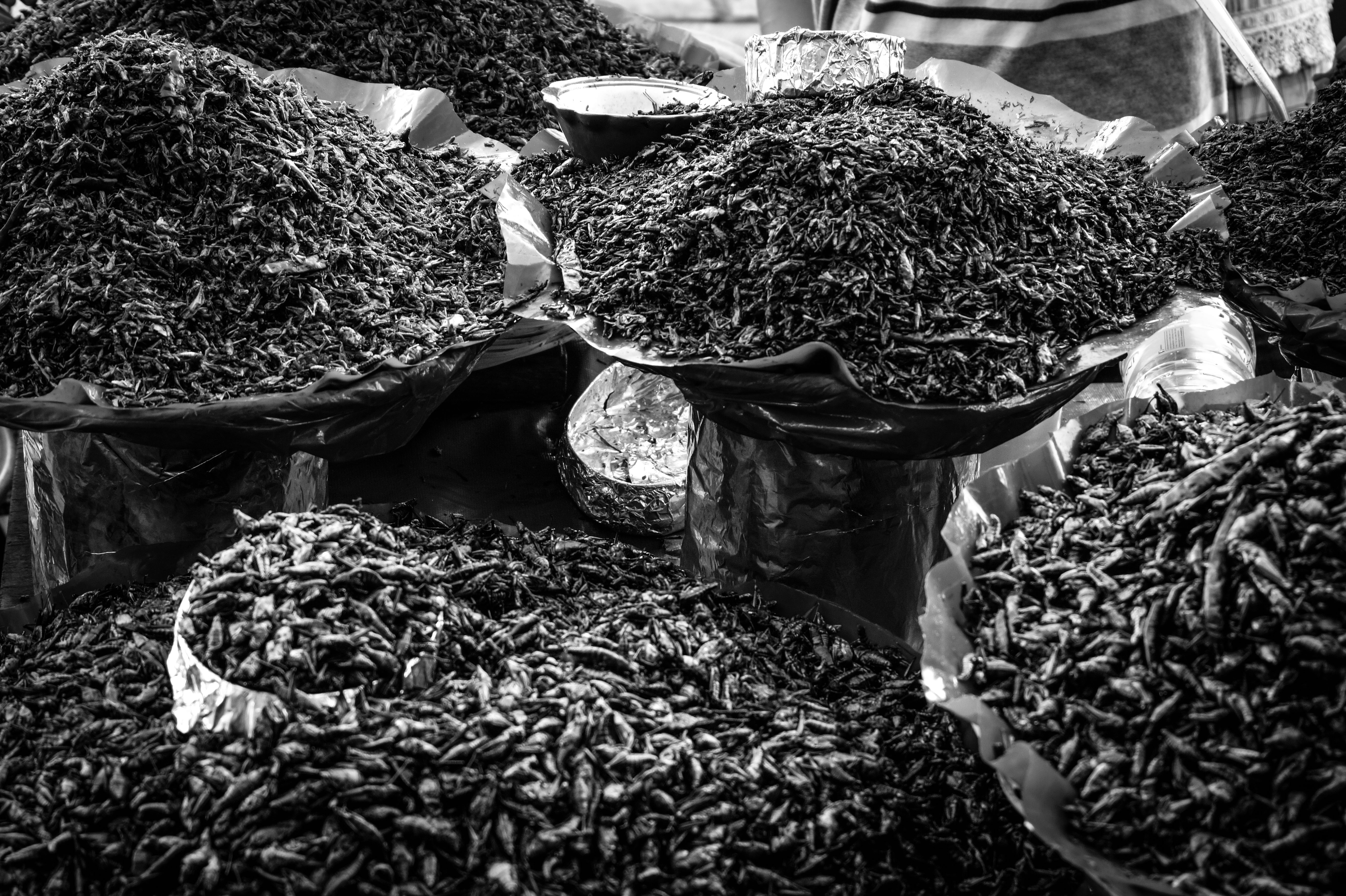
Chapulines, a popular edible grasshopper of Mexico

The organoleptic characteristics of edible insects vary between species and are influenced by environment. For instance, aquatic edible insects such as water boatmen (family Corixidae) and dragonfly larvae have a fish flavor, while diving beetles taste more like clams. Environment is not always a predictor of flavor, as terrestrial edible insects may also exhibit fish-like flavors (e.g. crickets, grasshoppers). Over 400 volatile compounds responsible for the aroma and flavor of edible insects have been identified. Pheromone chemicals contribute to pungent aromas and flavors in some species and the presence of organic acids (like formic acid in ants) makes some species taste sour. Organoleptic characteristics are dependent on the development stage of the insect (egg, larva, pupa, nymph, or adult) and may change significantly as an insect matures. For example, texture can change from soft to crunchy as an insect develops from larva to adult due to increasing exoskeletal chitin. Cooking method is considered the strongest influence on the final flavor of edible insects. Wet-cooking methods such as scalding or steaming remove pheromones and odor compounds, resulting in a milder flavor, while dry-cooking methods such as frying and roasting introduce more complex flavors.

The table below provides common flavor descriptors for a selection of edible insects. Flavors will vary with preparation method (e.g. raw, dried, fried, etc.). Insect development stage is provided when possible.

Flavor descriptors of a selection of edible insects
Insect	Scientific name	Development stage	Flavor
Agave worm (white)	Aegiale hesperiaris	Larvae	Cracklings
Agave worm (red)	Comadia redtenbacheri	Larvae	Spicy
Ants	Family Formicidae	Adult	Sweet, nutty
Carpenter ant	Camponotus spp.	Adult	Charred lemon
Wood ant	Formica spp.	Adult	Kaffir lime
Black witch moth	Ascalapha odorata	Larvae	Herring
Cockroach	Order Blattodea	-	Mushroom
Cricket	Superfamily Grylloidea	Adult	Fish
Corn earworm	Helicoverpa zea	Larvae	Sweet corn
Dragonfly	Suborder Anisoptera	Larvae	Fish
Grasshopper	Suborder Caelifera	Adult	Fish
Honey bee	Apis spp.	Brood	Butter, milk, herbal, vegetal, meaty, mushroom
Mealworm	Tenebrio molitor	-	Nutty (larvae); whole wheat bread (adult)
Mealybug	Family Pseudococcidae	-	Fried potato
Stinkbug	Family Pentatomidae	Adult	Apple
Termite	Infraorder Isoptera	Adult	Nutty
Treehopper	Family Membracidae	-	Avocado, zucchini
Wasp	Suborder Apocrita	-	Pine nut
Water boatmen	Family Corixidae	-	Caviar (egg); fish, shrimp (adult)

== Farming, production, and processing ==
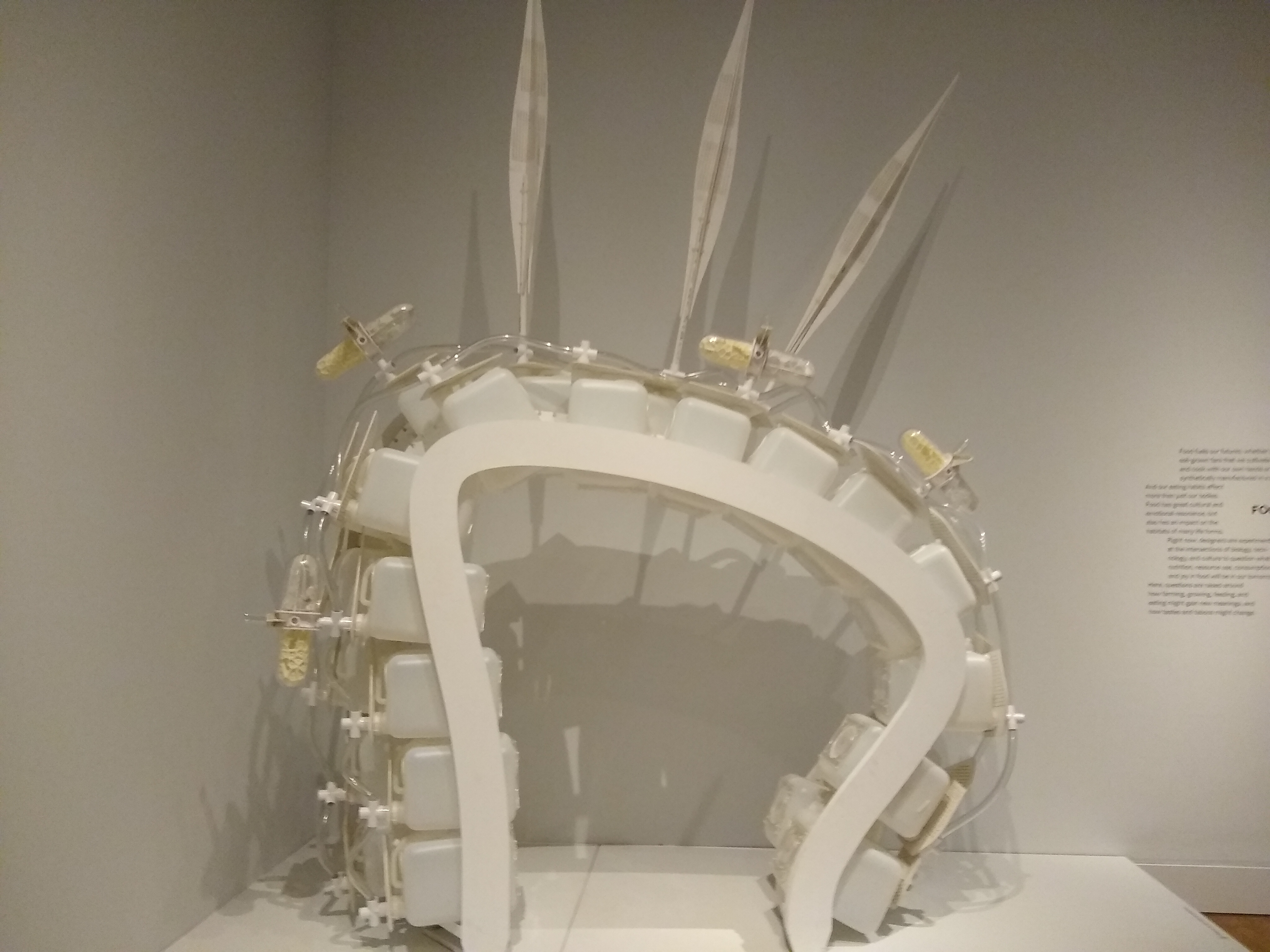
Cricket Shelter Modular Edible Insect Farm, designed by Terreform ONE

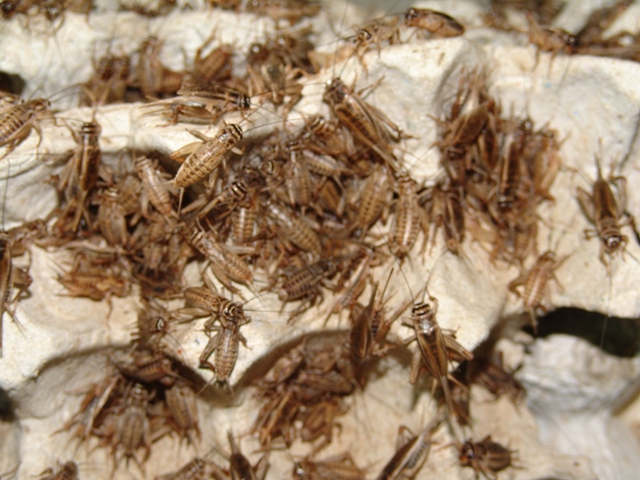
Crickets being raised for human consumption

Edible insects are raised as livestock in specialized insect farms. In North American as well as European countries such as the Netherlands or Belgium, insects are produced under strict food law and hygiene standards for human consumption.

Conditions such as temperature, humidity, feed, water sources, and housing, vary depending on the insect species. The insects are raised from eggs to larvae status (mealworms, lesser mealworms) or to their mature form (crickets, locusts) in industrialized insect farms and then killed via temperature control. Culled insects may be freeze-dried and packed whole, or pulverized to insect powder (insect flour) to be used in other food products such as baked goods or snacks.

In addition to nutritional composition and digestibility, insect species are selected for ease of rearing by the producer based on factors such as disease susceptibility, feed conversion efficiency, rate of development, and generational turnover.

=== Insect food products ===
The following processed foods are produced in North America (including Canada), and the EU:

- Insect flour: Pulverized, freeze-dried insects (e.g., cricket flour).
- Insect burger: Hamburger patties made from insect powder / insect flour (mainly from mealworms or from house cricket) and other ingredients.
- Insect fitness bars: Protein bars containing insect powder (mostly house crickets).
- Insect pasta: Pasta made of wheat flour, fortified with insect flour (house crickets or mealworms).
- Insect bread (Finnish Sirkkaleipä): Bread baked with insect flour (mostly house crickets).
- Insect snacks: Crisps, flips or small snacks (bites) made with insect powder and other ingredients.

Food and drink companies such as the Australian brewery Bentspoke Brewing Co, Canadian Crickstart Food, and the South African startup Gourmet Grubb have introduced insect-based beer, protein bars, a milk alternative, and insect ice cream.

While these products are more and more available, recent research suggests that insect-based foods are unlikely to significantly replace traditional meat. Only a small minority of consumers would consider replacing meat with insects, which are generally viewed as a complement rather than a substitute. In the US and Europe, where insects are not traditionally eaten, cultural barriers limit adoption, making plant-based alternatives a far more promising solution.

Products made using insects as ingredients

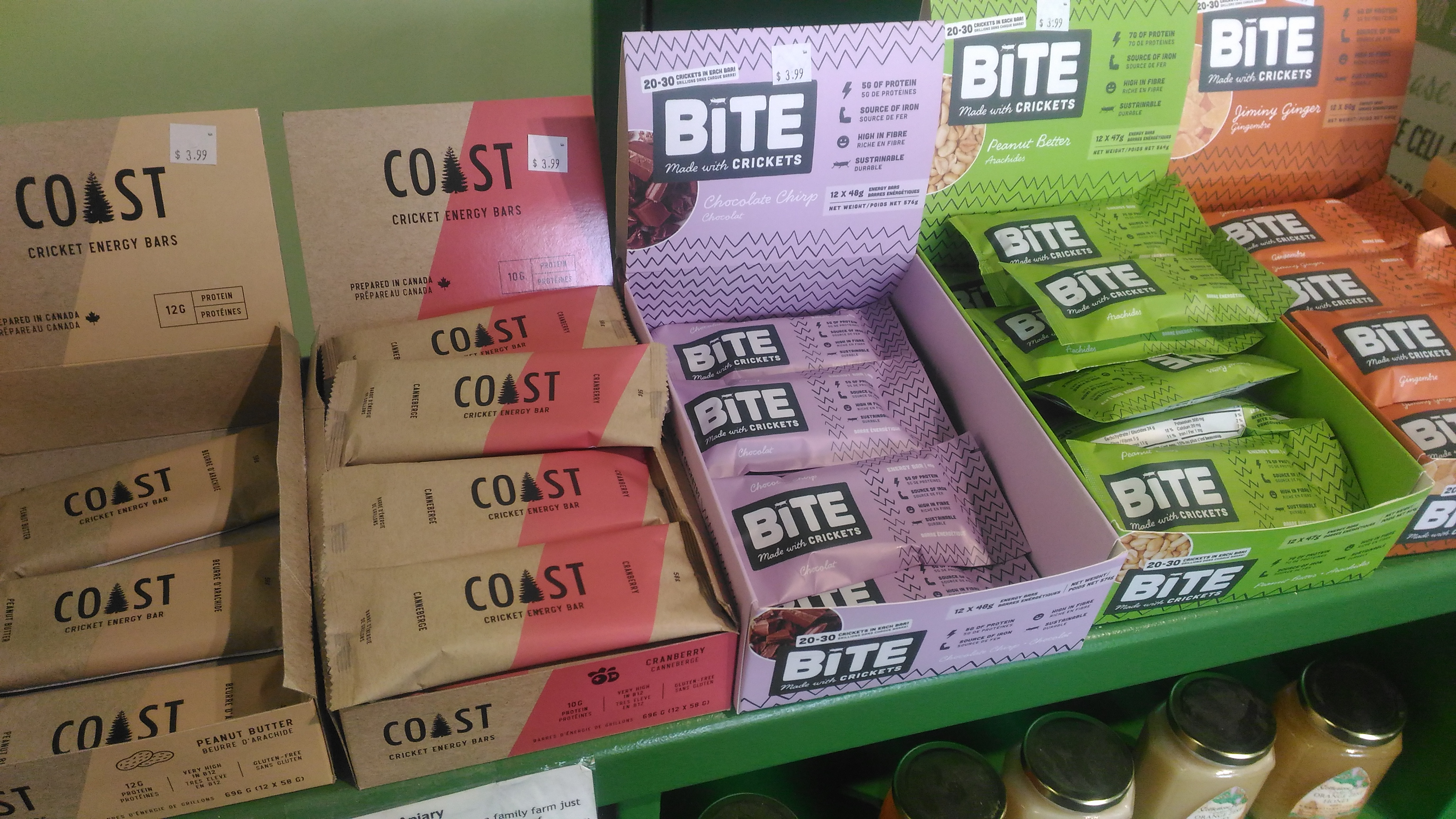
Insect energy bar made with processed crickets

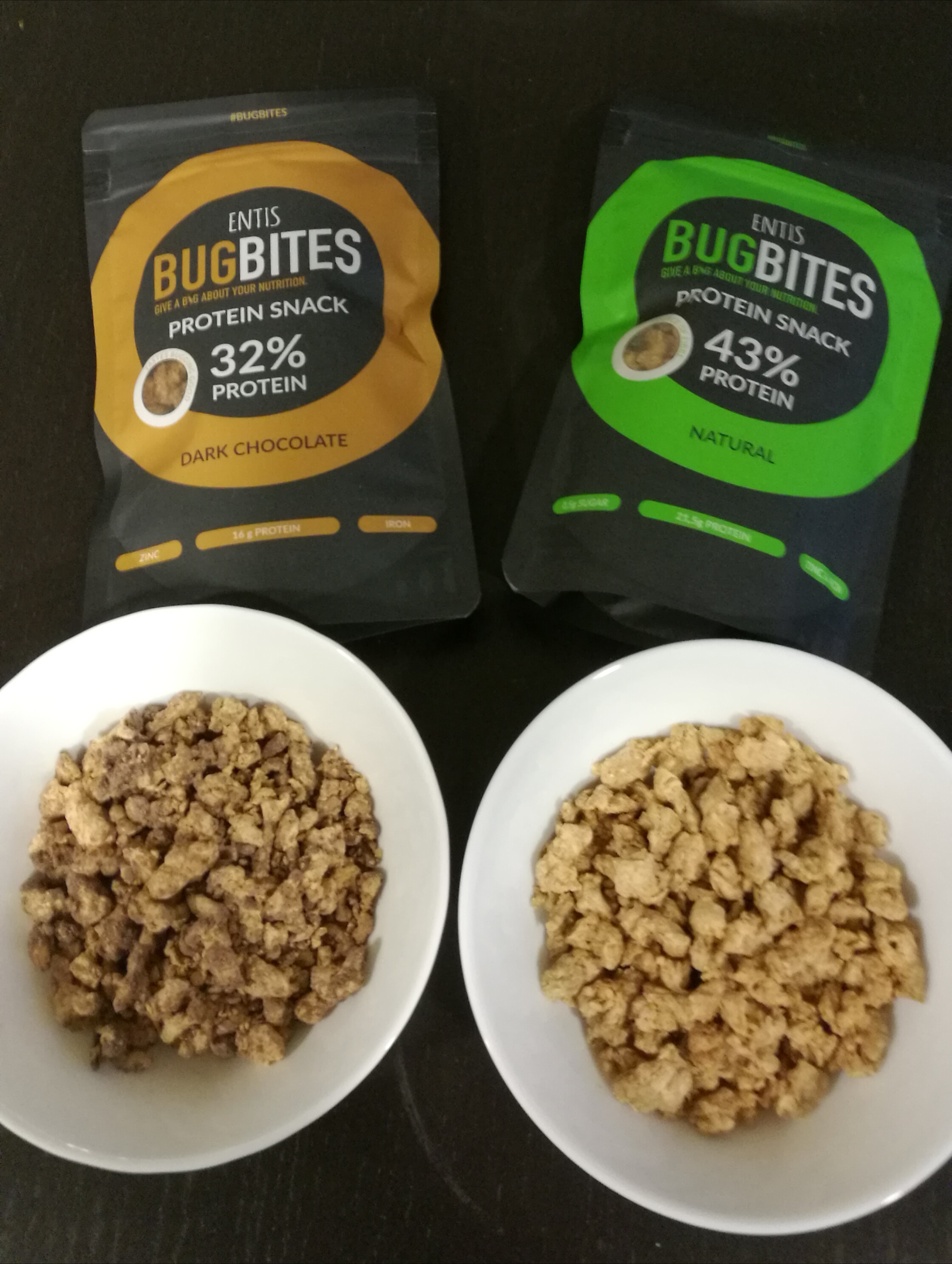
Insect snacks (bites) with cultivated cricket flour and oats

== Food safety and regulation ==
=== Safety assessment and authorisation ===
==== EU ====
In the European Union, edible insects – whole or in parts, e.g., legs, wings, or heads – fall within the definition of novel food, given by the European Commission. Dossiers for several insect species are currently under review by the European Food Safety Authority (EFSA). In August 2018, the EFSA published a first risk profile for the house cricket as food. According to a risk assessment published by EFSA on 13 January 2021, the yellow mealworm is safe for human consumption. On 2 July 2021, EFSA published another scientific opinion stating that migratory locust in frozen, dried or ground state is safe for human consumption. On 17 August 2021, EFSA published a safety assessment with view to house crickets (Acheta domesticus) stating that frozen and dried formulations from whole house crickets are safe for consumption. On 4 July 2022, EFSA published an opinion confirming the safety of frozen and freeze-dried formulations of the lesser mealworm (Alphitobius diaperinus in larval state) for human consumption.

Following EFSA's assessment, the European Commission has authorized the following edible insects as novel food in the EU:

- Dried Tenebrio molitor larvae (mealworms) with the Commission Implementing Regulation (EU) 2021/882 of 1 June 2021 (in force on 22 June 2021).
- Frozen, dried and powdered forms of migratory locust (Locusta migratoria) with the Commission Implementing Regulation (EU) 2021/1975 of 12 November 2021 (in force on 5 December 2021).
- Frozen, dried and powdered forms of house cricket (Acheta domesticus) with the Commission Implementing Regulation (EU) 2022/188 of 10 February 2022.
- Frozen, paste, dried and powder forms of lesser mealworm larvae (Alphitobius diaperinus) with the Commission Implementing Regulation (EU) 2023/58 of 5 January 2023.

==== Switzerland ====
On 1 May 2017, Switzerland approved the following insect species as food:

- House cricket (Acheta domesticus)
- European locust (Locusta migratoria)
- Mealworms (Tenebrio molitor as larvae)

Under certain conditions, these may be offered to consumers whole, pulverized, or processed in food products.

==== UK ====
After the Brexit transition period, the regulation regarding edible insects changed in the United Kingdom on 21 January 2021, making them non-marketable without authorization. Insect food products that had been on the market had to be recalled. Insect food products have to be authorized by the Food Standards Agency (FSA) in a novel food authorization process. In February 2022, UK insect industry association Woven Network CIC submitted a first dossier for the authorization of house crickets (Acheta domesticus) as novel food to the FSA.

==== United States and Canada ====
In the United States and Canada, insects for human consumption are not classified as novel food and the import and sale is permitted. In the United States, insect food products must comply with Food and Drug Administration (FDA) standards and food labeling regulations (including allergy risk labelling).

Within the Federal Food, Drug, and Cosmetic Act of 1938 (FD&C Act), the FDA states that "The term 'food' means (1) articles used for food or drink for man or other animals, (2) chewing gum, and (3) articles used for components of any such article." Thus, with insects falling under said category, they must be safe and may not bear any added poisonous or added deleterious substance that is unsafe. Said items may not be prepared, packed, or held under insanitary conditions, and must be produced in accordance with current Good Manufacturing Practice (GMP), regulations for manufacturing/processing, packing, or holding human food. The FD&C Act also includes requirements that pertain to the labeling of food and preventive controls, as applicable. Manufacturers have a responsibility to ensure that the food they produce for the United States market is safe and complies with the FD&C Act and FDA's implementing regulations.

In Canada, insects are subject to the same standards and guidelines as other foods sold in stores or online.

==== Singapore ====
Singapore Food Agency (SFA) has approved 16 species of insects, such as crickets, silkworms and grasshoppers, for human consumption in the second half of 2023.

The approval of the insects for consumption will be subject to food safety requirements, including treatment processes to kill pathogens and ensuring that they are packed and stored safely to prevent contamination.

=== Discussed health risks ===
Like other foods, the consumption of edible insects could present health risks stemming from biological, toxicological, and allergenic hazards. Biological hazards include bacteria, viruses, protozoa, fungi and mycotoxins; toxological risks are poisons, pesticides, heavy metals and antinutrients; allergenic hazards relate to arginine kinase, tropomyosin and α-Amylase. Additionally, recent studies have indicated that proteins from yellow mealworm (Tenebrio molitor) may act as allergens, potentially triggering immunoglobulin E (IgE)-mediated allergic reactions and cross-reactivity, especially in individuals already sensitized to crustaceans or other arthropods.

Chitin, a component of insect exoskeletons and other body parts, induces cytokine production in the digestive systems of humans and other mammals. Enzymes break the chitin down into smaller fragments, which trigger an immune response that results in inflammatory and allergic reactions. The human immune response to chitin is thought to be related to the abundance of dust mites as a cause of airway inflammatory disease and parasites as a cause of numerous diseases.

In general, insects harvested from the wild pose a greater risk than farmed insects, and insects consumed raw pose a greater risk than insects that are cooked before consumption. Feed substrate and growing conditions are the main factors influencing the microbiological and chemical hazards of farmed insects.

The table below combined the data from two studies published in Comprehensive Reviews in Food Science and Food Safety and summarized the potential hazards of the top five insect species consumed by humans.

Insect order	Common name	Hazard category	Potential hazard
Coleoptera	Beetle	Chemical	Hormones
Coleoptera	Beetle	Chemical	Cyanogenic substances
Coleoptera	Beetle	Chemical	Heavy metal contamination
Lepidoptera	Silkworm	Allergic	
Lepidoptera	Silkworm	Chemical	Thiaminase
Lepidoptera	Honeycomb moth	Microbial	High bacterial count
Lepidoptera	Honeycomb moth	Chemical	Cyanogenic substances
Hymenoptera	Ant	Chemical	Antinutritional factors (tannin, phytate)
Orthoptera	House cricket	Microbial	High bacterial count
Hemiptera		Parasitical	Chagas disease
Diptera	Black soldier fly	Parasitical	Myiasis

The hazards identified in the above table can be controlled in various ways. Allergens can be labelled on the package to avoid consumption by allergy-susceptible consumers. Selective farming can be used to minimize chemical hazards, whereas microbial and parasitical hazards can be controlled by cooking processes.

As a further guarantee for consumers, quality labeling has been introduced by the Entotrust programme, an independent and voluntary product certification of insect-based foods, which allows producers to communicate the safety and sustainability of their activities.

== Environmental benefits ==
Insects require significantly less feed, can be used in feed, and release fewer CO_{2} emissions than conventional animal food sources. They can be used to address the issue of depleted agricultural lands as they do not need much space to be reared as compared to livestock. Insects may be a sustainable commercial farming option to support populations struggling with food security due to their nutrition and farming capacities, taking less room to cultivate than other protein sources. Additionally, since insects can eat food waste, and they require less feed, they are a good option to address food waste. However, insect consumption remains less sustainable overall than plant-based food, and insects are often used as feed for aquaculture and livestock rather than for direct human consumption.

== Challenges ==
There are challenges associated with the production, processing, and consumption of insects as food.

=== Production ===
Mass production in the insect industry is a concern due to a lack of technology and funds to efficiently harvest and produce insects. The machinery would have to house proper enclosure for each life cycle of the insect as well as the temperature control as that is key for insect development.

=== Processing ===
The availability of wild-harvested insects can be seasonally dependent. This presents a challenge, as many wild-harvested insects have a short shelf life, sometimes of only a day or two. Identifying methods of processing and storing that extend the shelf life of seasonal insects will improve the efficiency of their harvest and consumption.

=== Aversion ===
The concept of eating insects is generally taboo in Western cultures. Although recent studies show some emerging interest, public polling in the US and Europe indicates that only about 20% would consider eating insects, compared to 91% of respondents willing to try plant-based "alternative meats",. In recent years however, a certain level of interest was observed according to related consumer studies.

=== Insect welfare ===
There are concerns that insect farming may involve large-scale suffering. Although the ability of insects to suffer is debated, the number of animals involved is particularly large. As of 2023, there are no widely adopted welfare standards in the industry.

== Awareness ==
World Edible Insect Day, held on 23 October, was introduced by Belgian entrepreneur Chris Derudder in 2015 to raise awareness globally for the consumption of edible insects, with a focus on Europe, North America, and Australia.

== See also ==
- Insects as feed
- Insect-based pet food
- List of edible insects by country
