= Insect Farming and Trading Agency =

The Insect Farming and Trading Agency (IFTA) was set up by the government of Papua New Guinea in 1978 to regulate the exploitation and conservation of Queen Alexandra's Birdwing and other valuable butterflies. Papua New Guinea has a significant butterfly fauna, including the world's largest butterflies, the Queen Alexandra's Birdwing (Ornithoptera alexandrae) and the Goliath Birdwing (Ornithoptera goliath). A Prior to the establishment of the government legislation, the butterfly trade depended upon expatriate dealers who traded in wild-caught specimens. A Food and Agriculture Organization project in the early seventies aided the Government in adopting this ecofriendly utilisation scheme.

The IFTA promotes the ecologically sound and sustainable practice of butterfly ranching where free ranging butterflies lay their eggs on foodplants specifically grown for this purpose. Eggs, larvae and pupae are protected and allowed to grow safely to adult stage. A portion of the newly hatched adults are harvested for the insect trade while the rest are released to complement the free-ranging population.

== See also ==
- Insect farming
