= Cricket flour =

Protein-rich powder made from crickets

Cricket flour (or cricket powder) is a protein-rich powder made from crickets, using various processes. Cricket flour differs from true flours made from grains by being composed mainly of protein rather than starches and dietary fiber.

== Nutritional information ==
Cricket flour contains nutrients such as the nine essential amino acids, calcium, iron, potassium, vitamin B_{12}, B_{2}, and fatty acids.

== Food safety and processing ==
When cultivated for human consumption in Western nations, insects are held to the same safety requirements as any other food. Depending on the popularity in a given location, processing might be done commercially or locally. The procedure begins with the removal of the insect's insides, albeit this step is optional. They are then dispatched to be preserved or freeze-dried, which is accomplished using hessian or polypropylene. They are transported for storage once they have been entirely preserved/dried. Insects can be frozen or ground into powders.

Cricket flour is produced from freeze-dried crickets. The crickets are then cooked to facilitate processing. They are pulverized into extremely fine bits after being cooked. The freezing, baking, and drying results in a powdered dark brown flour.

Insect flour is one of Whole Foods Market's banned ingredients in the U.S., with cricket flour being specifically mentioned on their paper bags.

== Cost ==
Prices can vary depending on location, but the average cost of cricket flour is around $40 per pound ($88/kg) (4,200 to 4,800 crickets). This price is inflated due to limited commercialization and few processors.

== Food products with cricket flour ==
Pulverized freeze-dried crickets are used in processed food products, such as:

- pasta
- bread
- cookies
- snacks (chips, nachos)
- smoothies

Cricket flour can be utilized as a complete replacement for flour. The taste is described as very nutty, and foods normally prepared with wheat flour may cook differently.

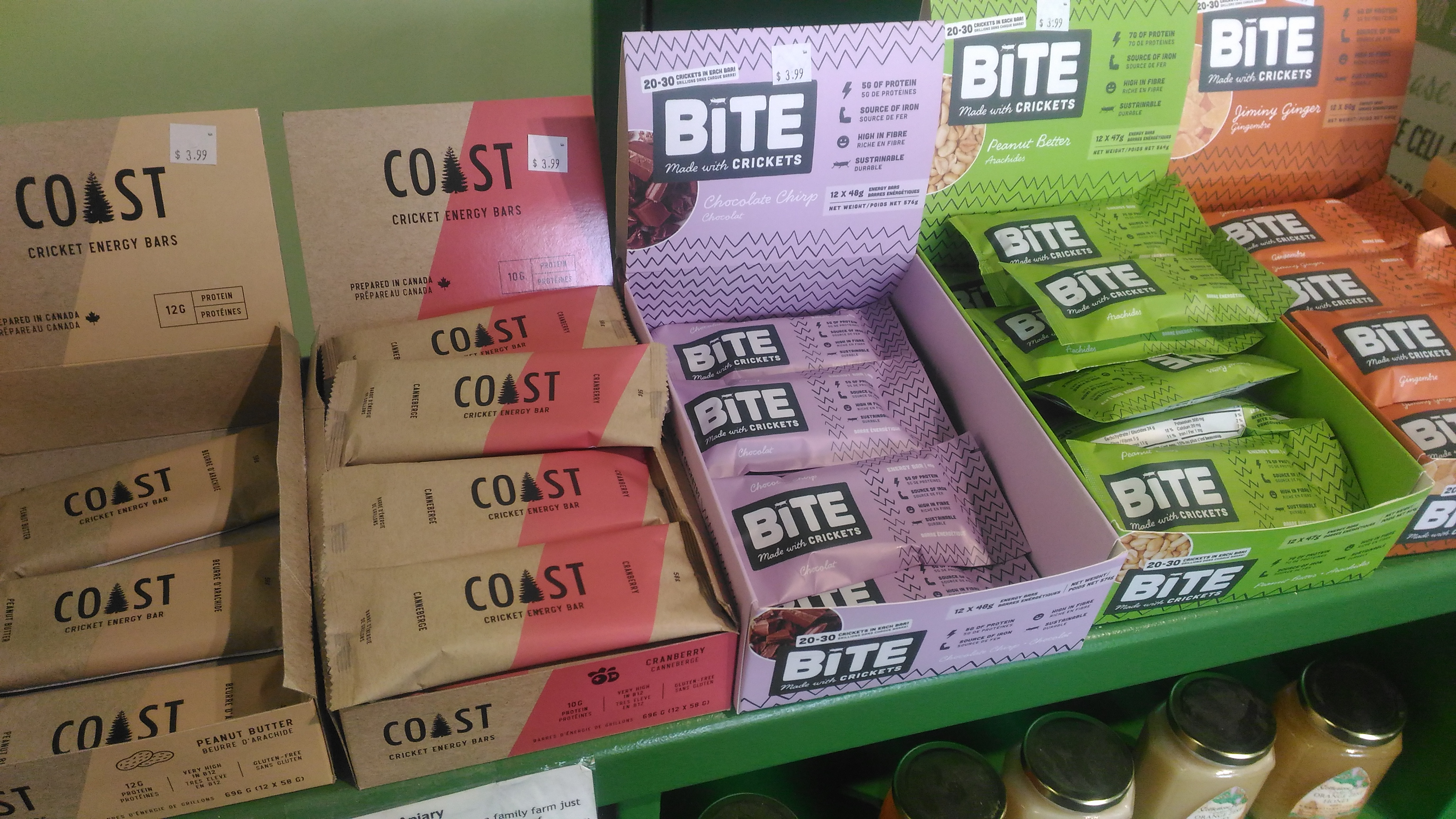
Insect energy bar made with processed crickets as ingredient

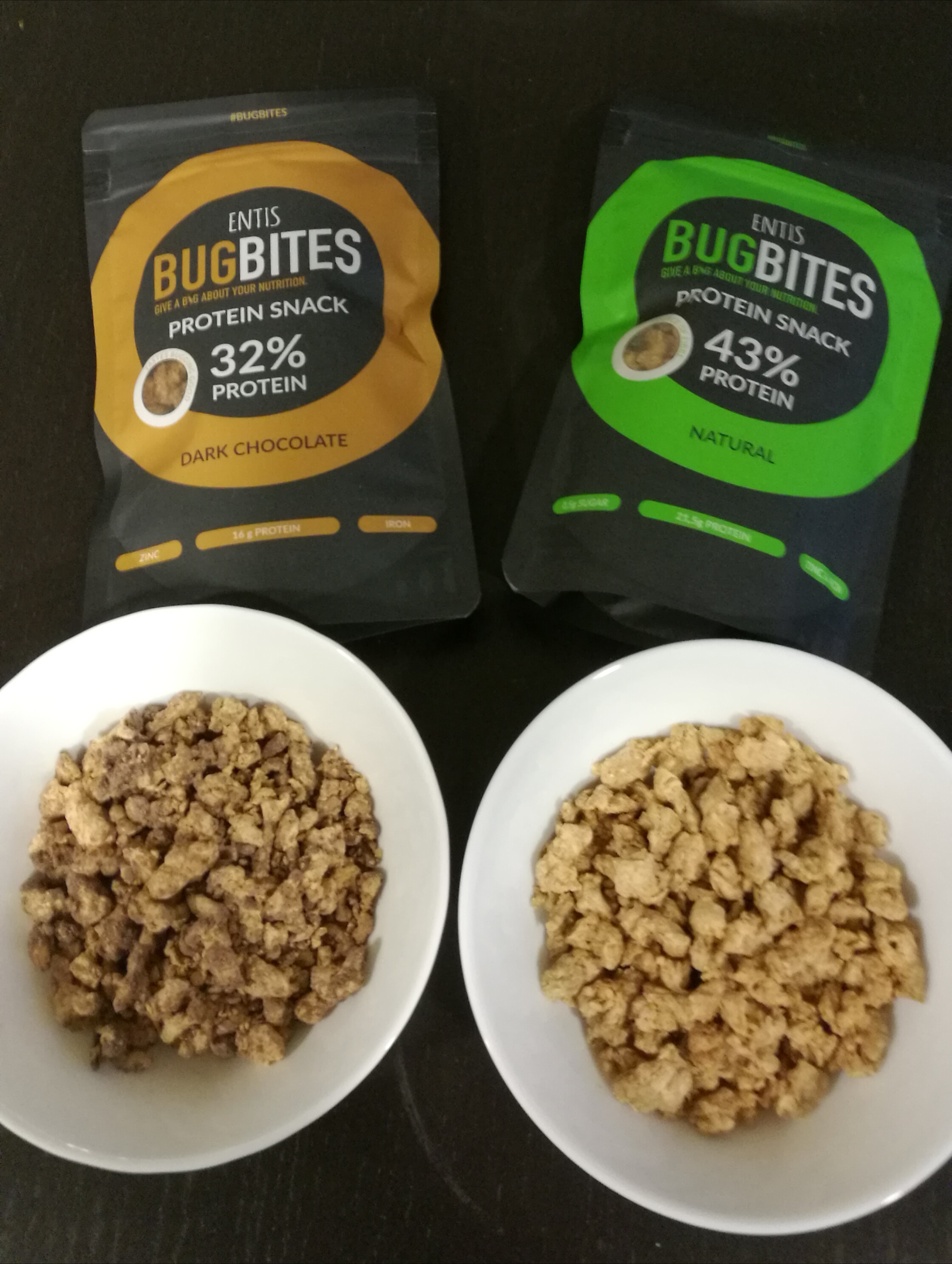
Insect snacks (bites) with cultivated cricket flour and oat

== See also ==
=== Insects as food ===
- Entomophagy
- Insects as food
- Insect-based pet food
- List of edible insects by country

=== Plant-sourced protein ===
- Pea protein
- Hemp protein
- Meat analogue
