= AgriProtein =

British agricultural and biotechnology company

- Type: Private
- Industry: Insect industry, feed manufacturing
- Founded: 2008; 18 years ago
- Headquarters: Guildford, England, UK
- Website: agriprotein.com

AgriProtein was a British agricultural and biotechnology company that used insects to convert food waste into sustainable products including: an alternative protein for use in livestock and aquaculture feed, a natural oil for use in animal feed, and an organic soil enhancer. The company was founded in 2008 in South Africa. AgriProtein was a subsidiary of the Insect Technology Group but went into administration in February 2021. It was taken over by Prezero in June 2021.

== Products ==
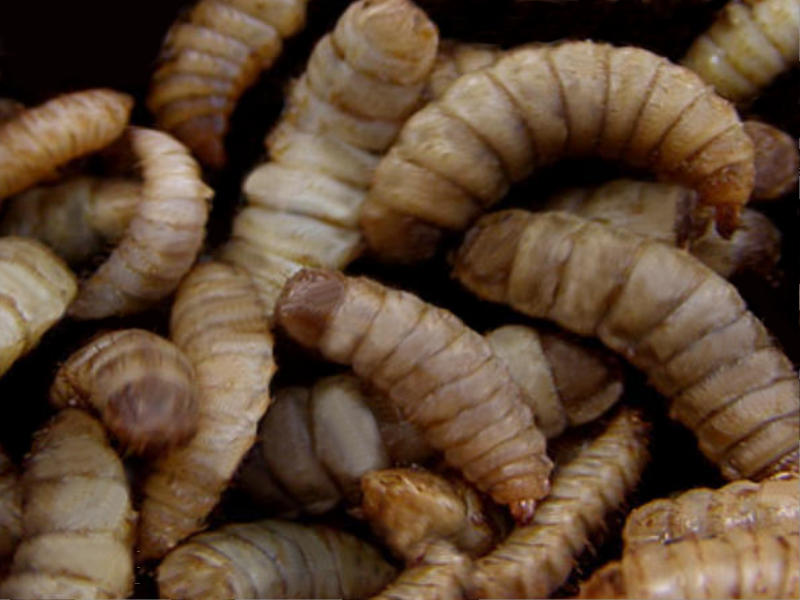
Black soldier fly larvae

Currently, AgriProtein breeds black soldier fly larvae on food waste from a variety of sources including restaurants and supermarkets. After they pupate, the larvae are processed into MagMeal - a sustainable, high quality protein that can be fed to all monogastric animals such as chickens, pigs, fish and pets. The company also produces an oil (MagOil) that can be used in aquaculture and pet food. MagOil is an alternative to less-sustainable oils such as palm oil. The company also produces an organic soil conditioning product called MagSoil.

== History ==
AgriProtein was founded in 2008 to provide an ecologically sound replacement for fishmeal, which is increasingly expensive because of the depletion of fish stocks. The AgriProtein process is noteworthy in that it diverts organic waste from landfills. After consultation with a researcher at Stellenbosch University, a presentation at Tedx in 2011, and approximately five years of development, the company opened its first commercial factory in 2015 in Philippi, near Cape Town International Airport. They received $11 million in initial investment funding, including two grants from the Bill and Melinda Gates Foundation.

Under a partnership instituted in February 2017 with Christof Industries, an Austrian engineering company, AgriProtein plans to establish standardised industrial-scale factories globally. In 2018, they raised $105 million in funding, the 18th largest recorded agricultural technology deal and the largest in the insect farming sector at the time, and agreed to buy Millibeter, a Belgian company in Turnhout.

They were awarded the 2013 United Nations Innovation Prize for Africa, have won the Australian Government's Blue Economy Challenge, were named a Global Cleantech 100 company in both 2017 and 2018, in 2017 were the first Food Chain Global Champion in the BBC Food & Farming Awards,. They were also included in Time's first annual list of "top 50 Genius Companies" in 2018.

AgriProtein have licensees worldwide and research centres studying fly genetics, insect breeding, and production of antibiotics for feed from larval proteins.
