= Fodder =

Agricultural foodstuff used to feed domesticated animals

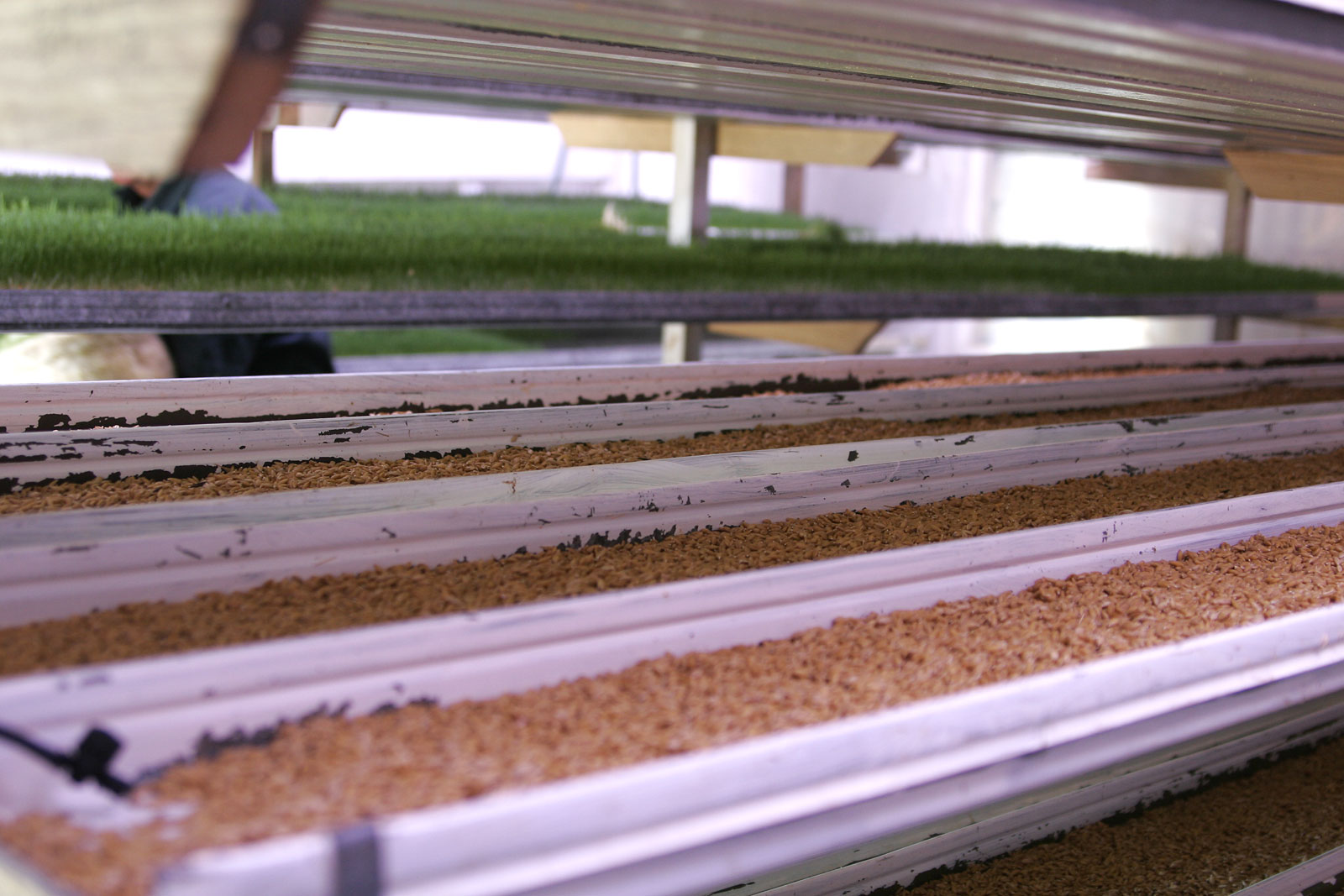
A fodder factory set up by an individual farmer to produce customised cattle feed

Fodder (/ˈfɒdər/), also called provender (/ˈprɒvəndər/), is any agricultural foodstuff used specifically to feed domesticated livestock, such as cattle, rabbits, sheep, horses, chickens and pigs. "Fodder" refers particularly to food given to the animals (including plants cut and carried to them), rather than that which they forage for themselves (called forage). Fodder includes hay, straw, silage, compressed and pelleted feeds, oils and mixed rations, and sprouted grains and legumes (such as bean sprouts, fresh malt, or spent malt). Most animal feed is from plants, but some manufacturers add ingredients to processed feeds that are of animal origin.

The worldwide animal feed trade produced 1.245 billion tons of compound feed in 2022 according to an estimate by the International Feed Industry Federation, with an annual growth rate of about 2%. The use of agricultural land to grow feed rather than human food can be controversial (see food vs. feed); some types of feed, such as corn (maize), can also serve as human food; those that cannot, such as grassland grass, may be grown on land that can be used for crops consumed by humans.

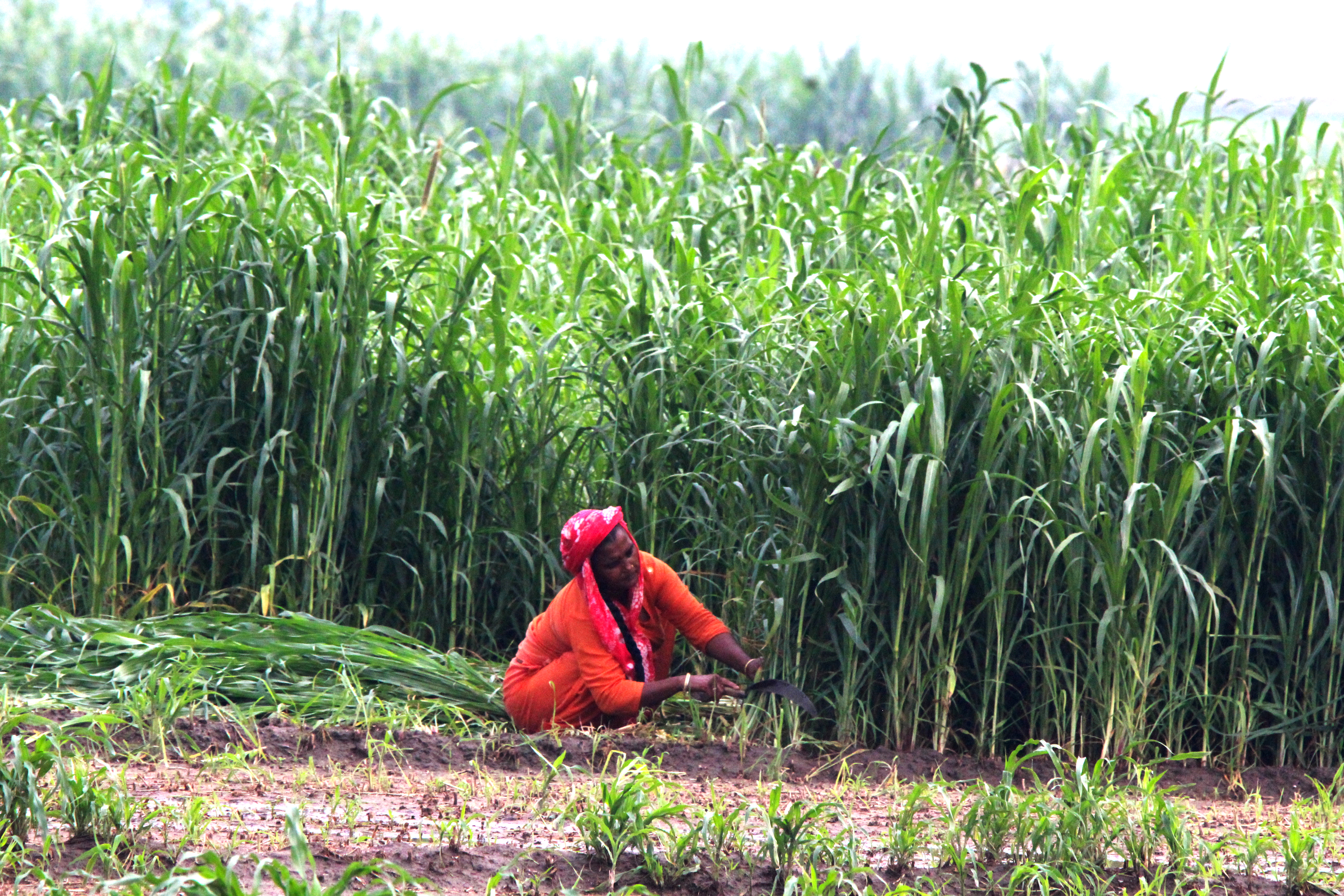
Manual cutting of green fodder, Punjab

== Common plants specifically grown for fodder ==
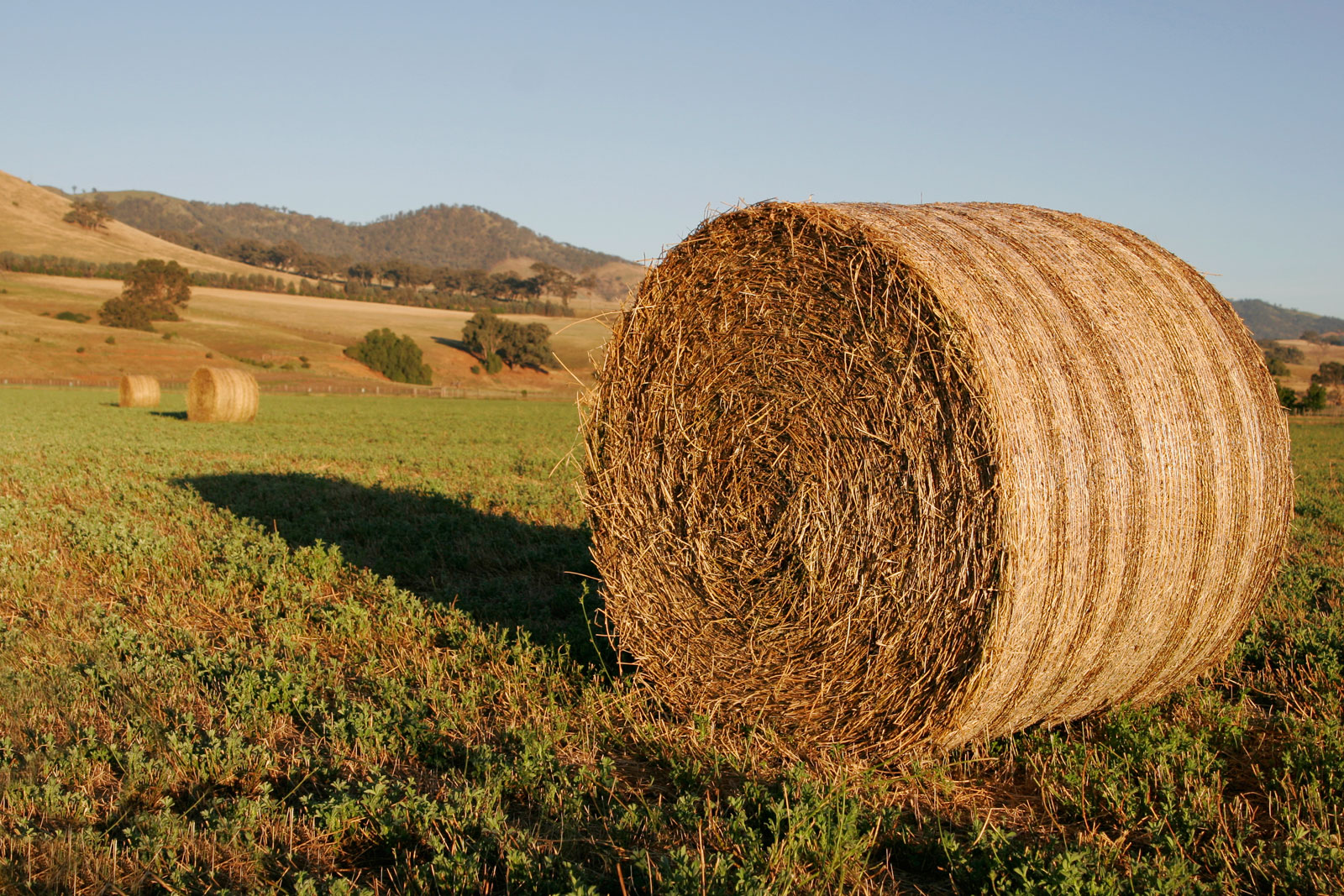
Round hay bales

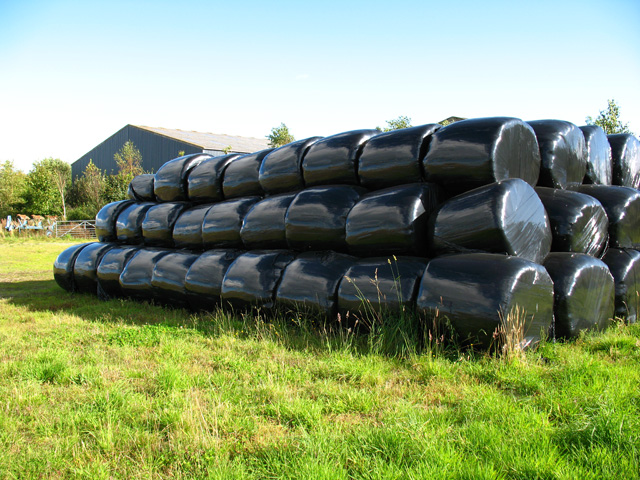
Stack of bales, sweet-smelling fodder stored for winter

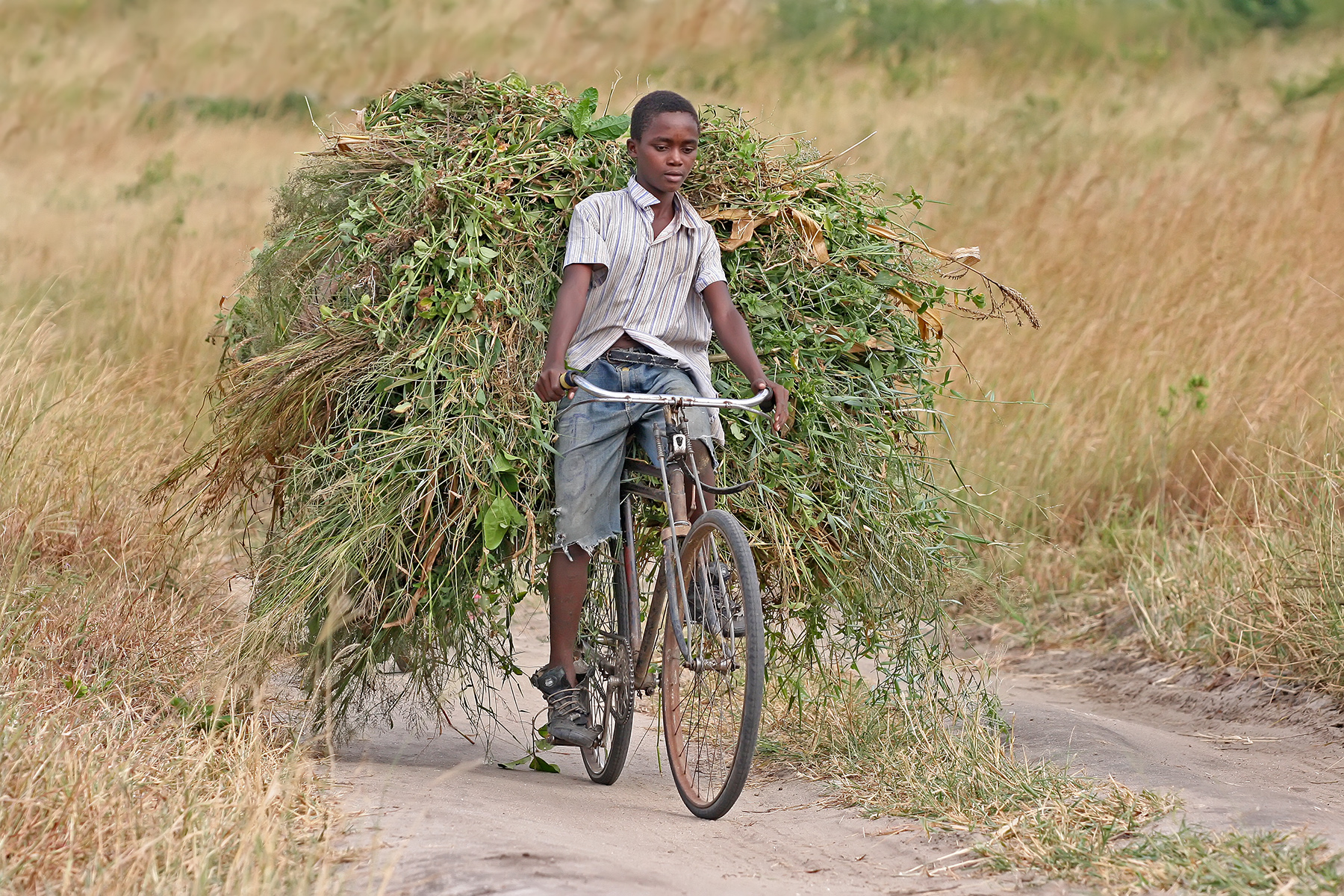
Cut green fodder being transported to cattle in Tanzania

- Alfalfa (lucerne)
- Barley
- Common duckweed
- Birdsfoot trefoil
- Brassica spp.
  - Kale
  - Rapeseed (canola)
  - Rutabaga (swede)
  - Turnip
- Clover
  - Alsike clover
  - Red clover
  - Subterranean clover
  - White clover
- Grass
  - Bermuda grass
  - Brome
  - False oat grass
  - Fescue
  - Heath grass
  - Meadow grasses (from naturally mixed grassland swards)
  - Orchard grass
  - Ryegrass
  - Timothy-grass
- Corn (maize)
- Millet
- Oats
- Sorghum
- Soybeans
- Trees (pollard tree shoots for "tree-hay")
- Wheat

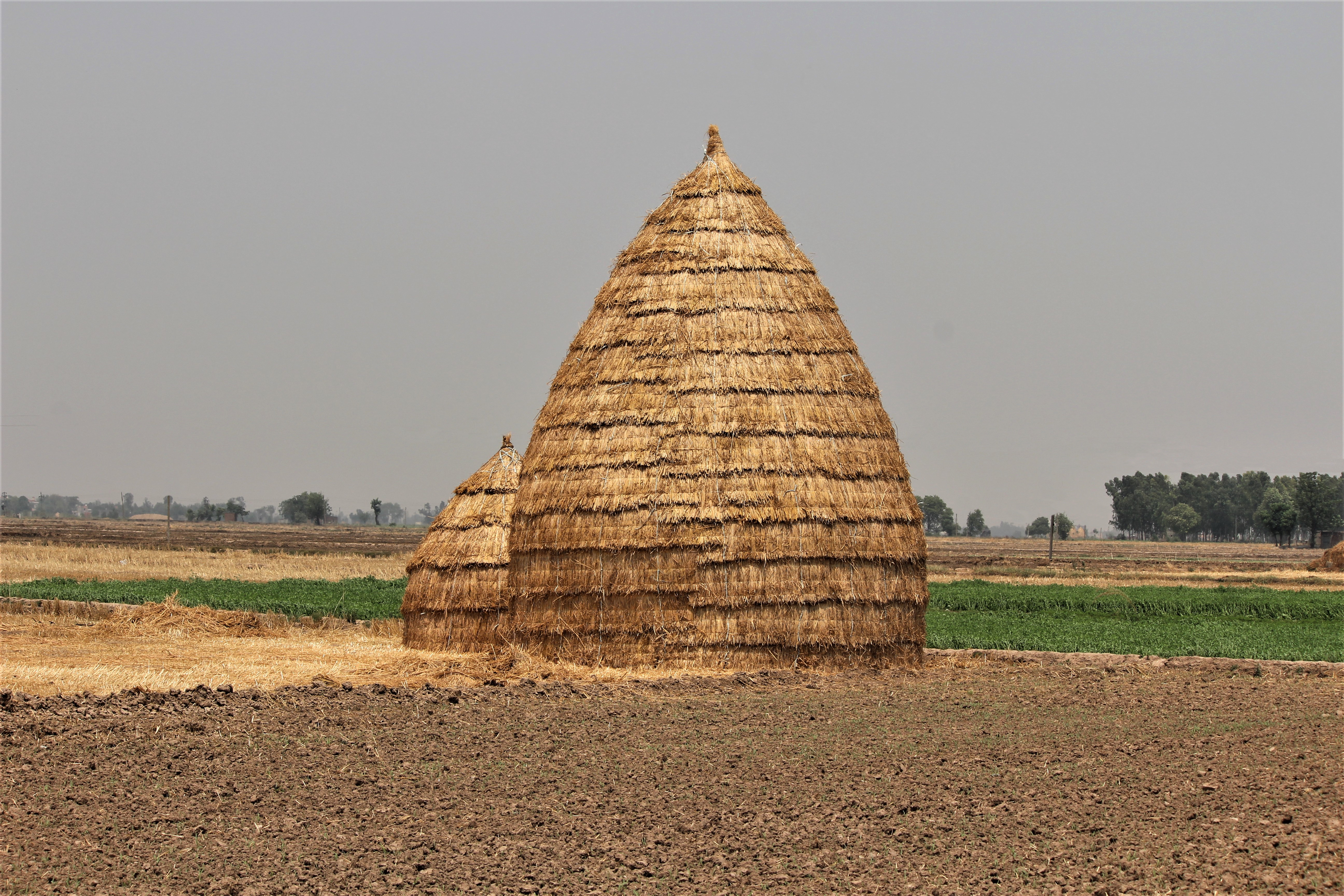
Traditional store of hay, Punjab

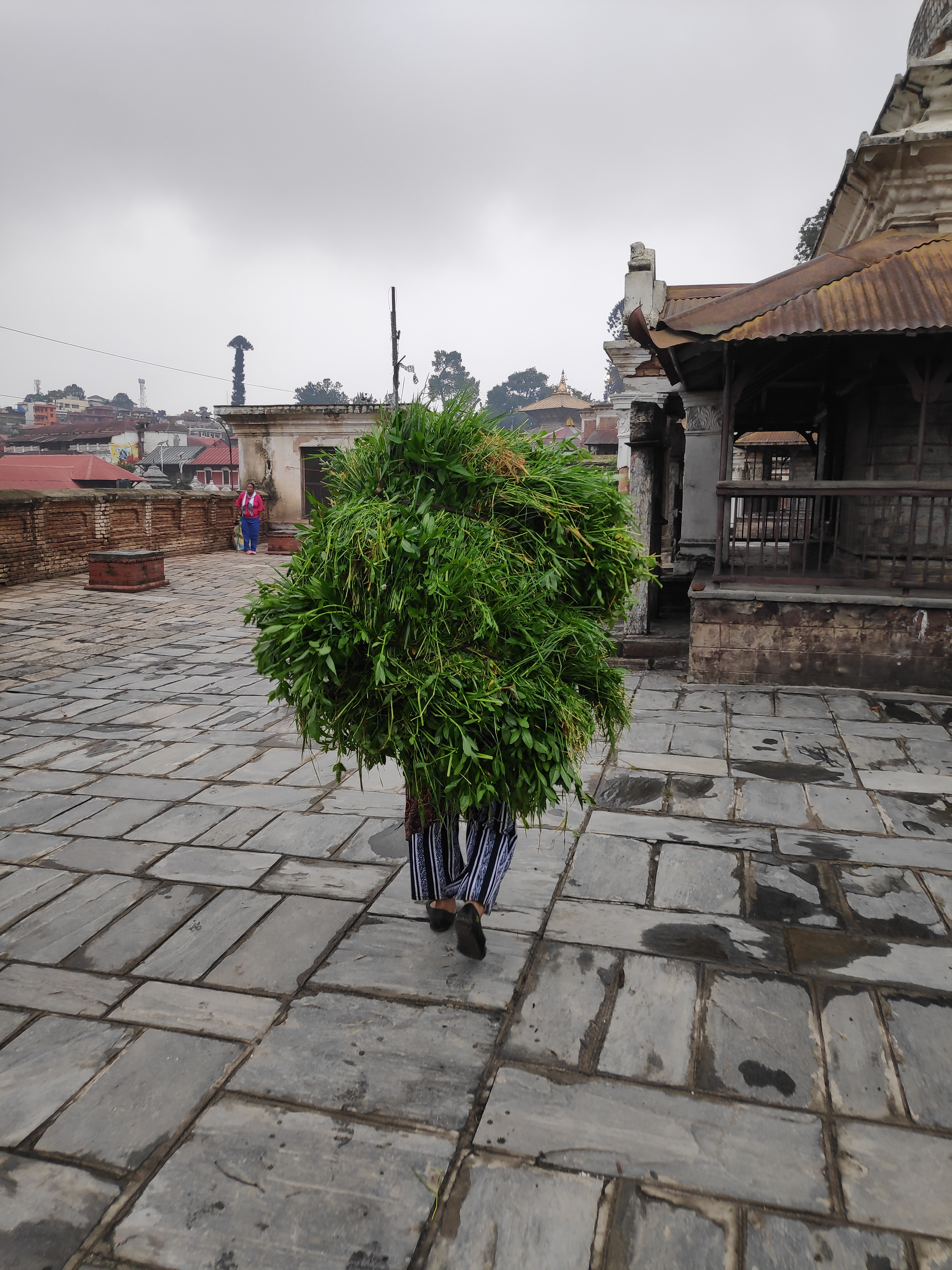
Cut green fodder being transported to cattle in Nepal

== Types ==
- Biochar for cattle
- Bran
- Conserved forage plants: hay and silage
- Compound feed and premixes, often called pellets, nuts or (cattle) cake
- Crop residues: stover, copra, straw, chaff, sugar beet waste
- Fish meal
- Freshly cut grass and other forage plants
- Grass or lawn clipping waste
- Green maize
- Green sorghum
- Horse gram
- Leaves from certain species of trees
- Meat and bone meal (now illegal in cattle and sheep feeds in many areas due to risk of BSE)
- Molasses
- Native green grass
- Oilseed press cake (cottonseed, safflower, sunflower, soybean, peanut or groundnut)
- Oligosaccharides
- Processed insects (i.e. processed maggots)
- Seaweed (including Asparagopsis taxiformis which is used mainly as a supplement to reduce methane emissions by up to 90%)
- Seeds and grains, either whole or prepared by crushing, milling, etc.
- Single cell protein(can also be made from atmospheric CO_{2})
- Sprouted grains and legumes
- Yeast extract (brewer's yeast residue)

== Health concerns ==
In the past, bovine spongiform encephalopathy (BSE, or "mad cow disease") spread through the inclusion of ruminant meat and bone meal in cattle feed due to prion contamination. This practice is now banned in most countries where it has occurred. Some animals have a lower tolerance for spoiled or moldy fodder than others, and certain types of molds, toxins, or poisonous weeds inadvertently mixed into a feed source may cause economic losses due to sickness or death of the animals. The US Department of Health and Human Services regulates drugs of the Veterinary Feed Directive type that can be present within commercial livestock feed.

== Droughts ==
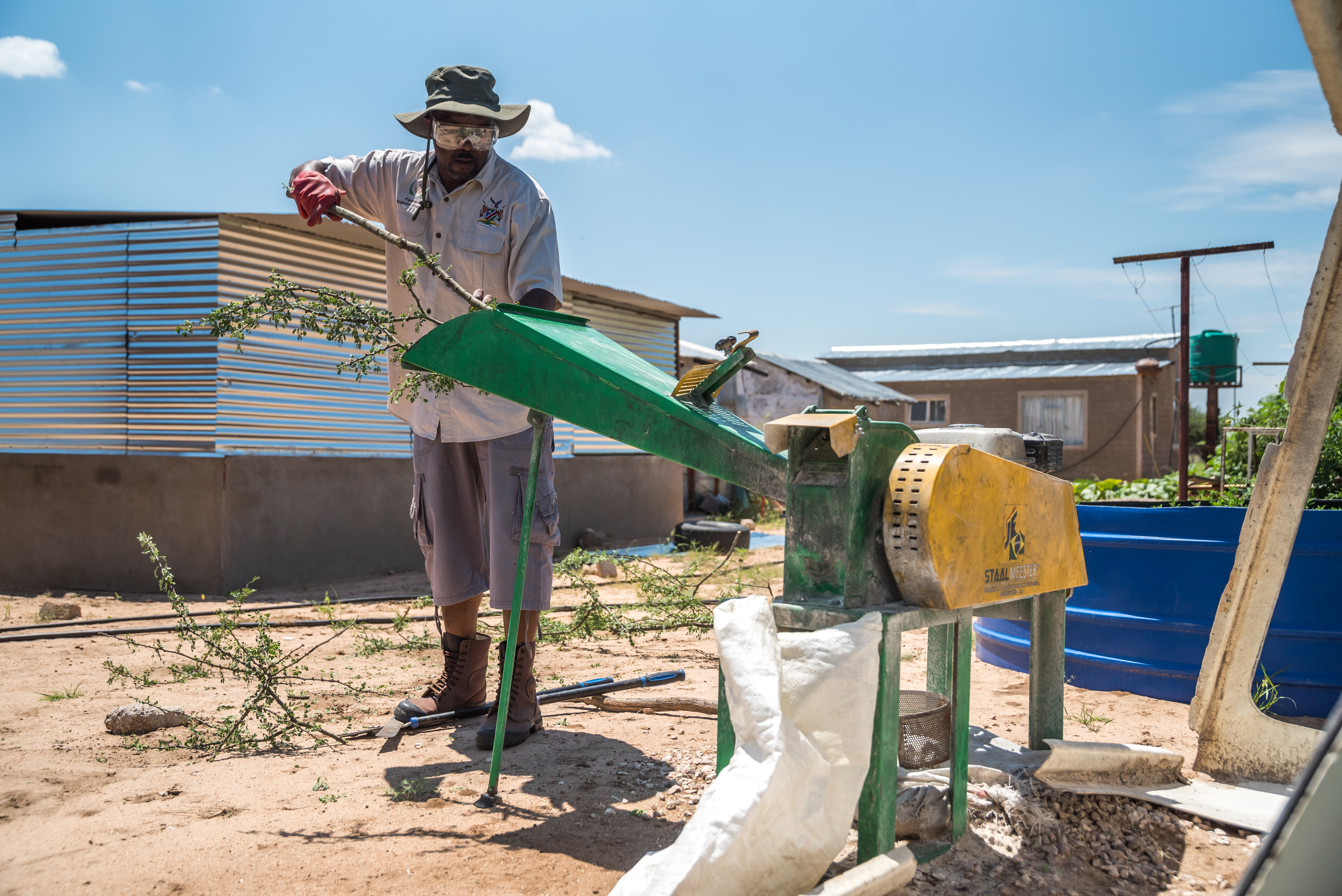
Milling shrubs for low-cost fodder, Namibia

Increasing intensities and frequencies of drought events put rangeland agriculture under pressure in semi-arid and arid geographic areas. Innovative emergency fodder production concepts have been reported, such as bush-based animal fodder production in Namibia. During extended dry periods, some farmers have used woody biomass fibre from encroacher bush as their primary source of cattle feed, adding locally available supplements for nutrients as well as to improve palatability.

== Sprouted grains as fodder ==
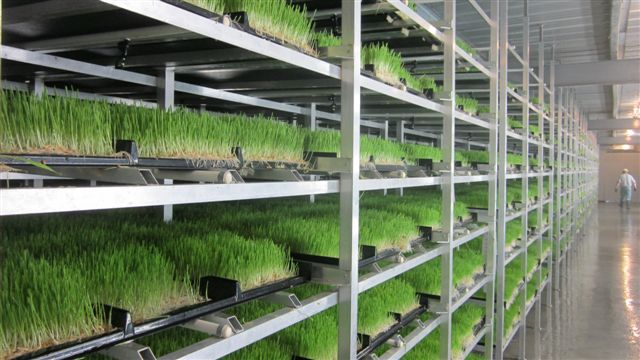
On-site grain sprouting, US

Fodder in the form of Sprouted cereal grains such as barley, and legumes can be grown in commercial quantities. Sprouted grains can significantly increase the nutritional value of the grain compared with feeding the ungerminated grain to stock. They use less water than traditional forage, making them ideal for drought conditions. Sprouted barley and other cereal grains can be grown hydroponically in a carefully controlled environment. Hydroponically grown sprouted fodder at 150 mm tall with a 50 mm root mat is at its peak for animal feed. Although barley is a grain, barley sprouts are approved by the American Grassfed Association as livestock feed.

== See also ==
- Cannon fodder (metaphorical usage)
- Circular agriculture
- Factory farming
- Feed manufacturing
- Food-feed system
- Pasture
