= Maggot farming =

Growing maggots for industrial use

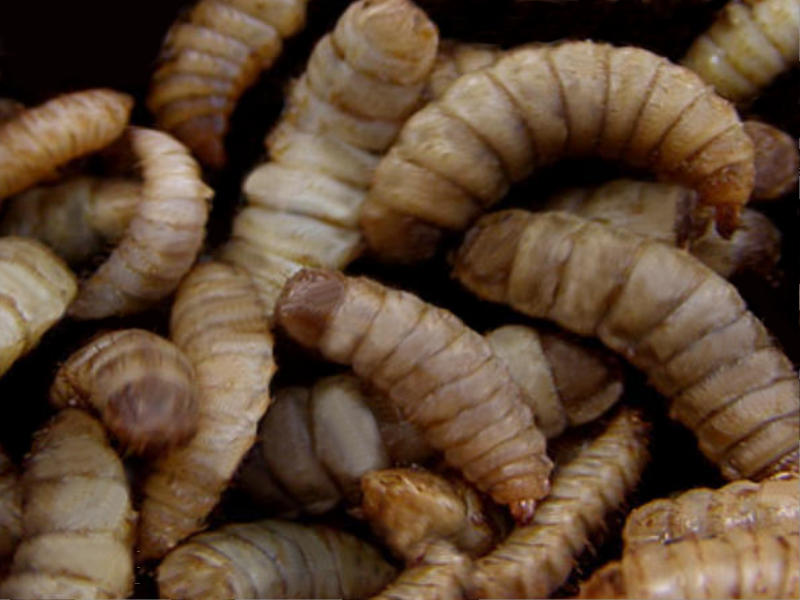
Maggots of black soldier fly, one species that is farmed

Maggot farming is the act of growing maggots for industry. It is distinct from vermicomposting, as no separate composting process is occurring and maggots are used to consume flesh, rather than earthworms to consume plant-based materials. Maggots are most heavily cultivated as a source of animal feed for livestock or fish.

== Species used ==
A variety of species can be used, including the black soldier fly (Hermetia illucens). Due to convenience, fly species that are indigenous to the area of cultivation are often used.

== Method of cultivation ==
When using indigenous fly species, one tactic (employed by the Songhai Center in Benin) is to simply dump offal or meat that has exceeded the sell-by date in concrete bins. The bins are then covered with chicken wire to prevent any large animals from feeding. Then, flies deposit eggs on the offal and meat, and maggots hatch and consume it. After that, the bins are filled with water, so the maggots start to float (separating themselves from any leftovers). The maggots are then harvested and the leftover is discarded or further processed (e.g., bones can be ground to bone meal). An alternative method can be seen used more commonly in small-scale applications, such as two trash bins stacked on top of each other. The bottom bin has a large hole cut on top, while the top has smaller, filtered holes on the bottom. Food (waste) is then inserted and left into the top bin, where the flies lay their eggs and produce maggots, shifting and separating into the bottom bin. Black soldier fly larvae are increasingly farmed for the bioconversion of organic waste streams into insect biomass rich in protein and lipids. The larvae are highly adaptable and can be reared on a wide range of organic side-streams, including food processing residues and agricultural by-products, while contributing to waste reduction. Substrate composition (and mainly substrate protein, fat and carbohydrate contents) can influence larval growth and conversion efficiency.

== Use of the maggots ==
The maggots are often sold and used as animal feed, in particular, for fish, chickens, pigs, and ducks.

== See also ==
- Protix
- Shelf life
- Biorefinery
