= Gliwice Arena =

Indoor arena in Gliwice, Poland

PreZero Arena Gliwice
- Gliwice Arena; Gliwice Hall

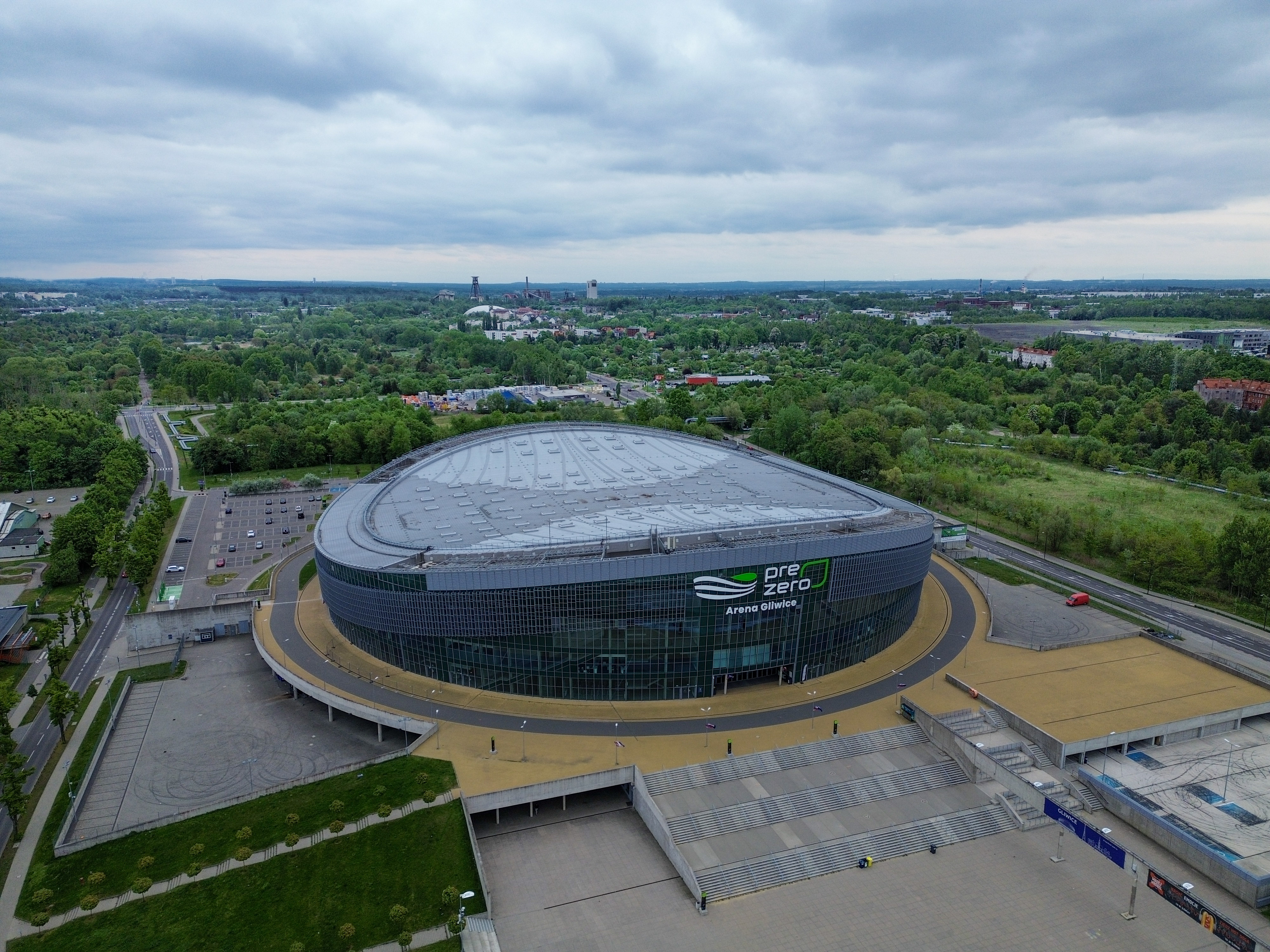
- PreZero Arena Gliwice in 2025
- Interactive map of PreZero Arena Gliwice
- Address: ul. Akademicka 50, 44-100 Gliwice
- Location: Gliwice, Poland
- Coordinates: 50°17′8.6″N 18°41′9.7″E
- Owner: City of Gliwice
- Operator: Arena Operator sp. z o.o.
- Capacity: 13,752 (seated); 17,178 (with standing)

Construction
- Built: 2013–2018
- Opened: 12 May 2018
- Cost: 420.4 million zł (€98 million)
- Architect: Perbo-Projekt
- Main contractor: Mirbud S.A.

Tenant
- GTK Gliwice (2018–present)

Website
- www.arenagliwice.com

Gliwice Arena, known for sponsorship reasons as PreZero Arena Gliwice, is a multi-purpose indoor arena in Gliwice, Poland. The main arena has 13,752 seats across its four stands and a capacity of up to 17,178 spectators with standing places, making it one of the largest indoor arenas in the country.

== Naming ==
The venue was originally named Podium Hall (Hala Podium), before being renamed Gliwice Hall (Hala Gliwice). Since its opening in May 2018, the name Gliwice Hall has been used interchangeably with Gliwice Arena, the latter being used for international events. In July 2023, it was announced that the venue would be renamed PreZero Arena Gliwice as part of a sponsorship deal with PreZero.

== Construction and facilities ==
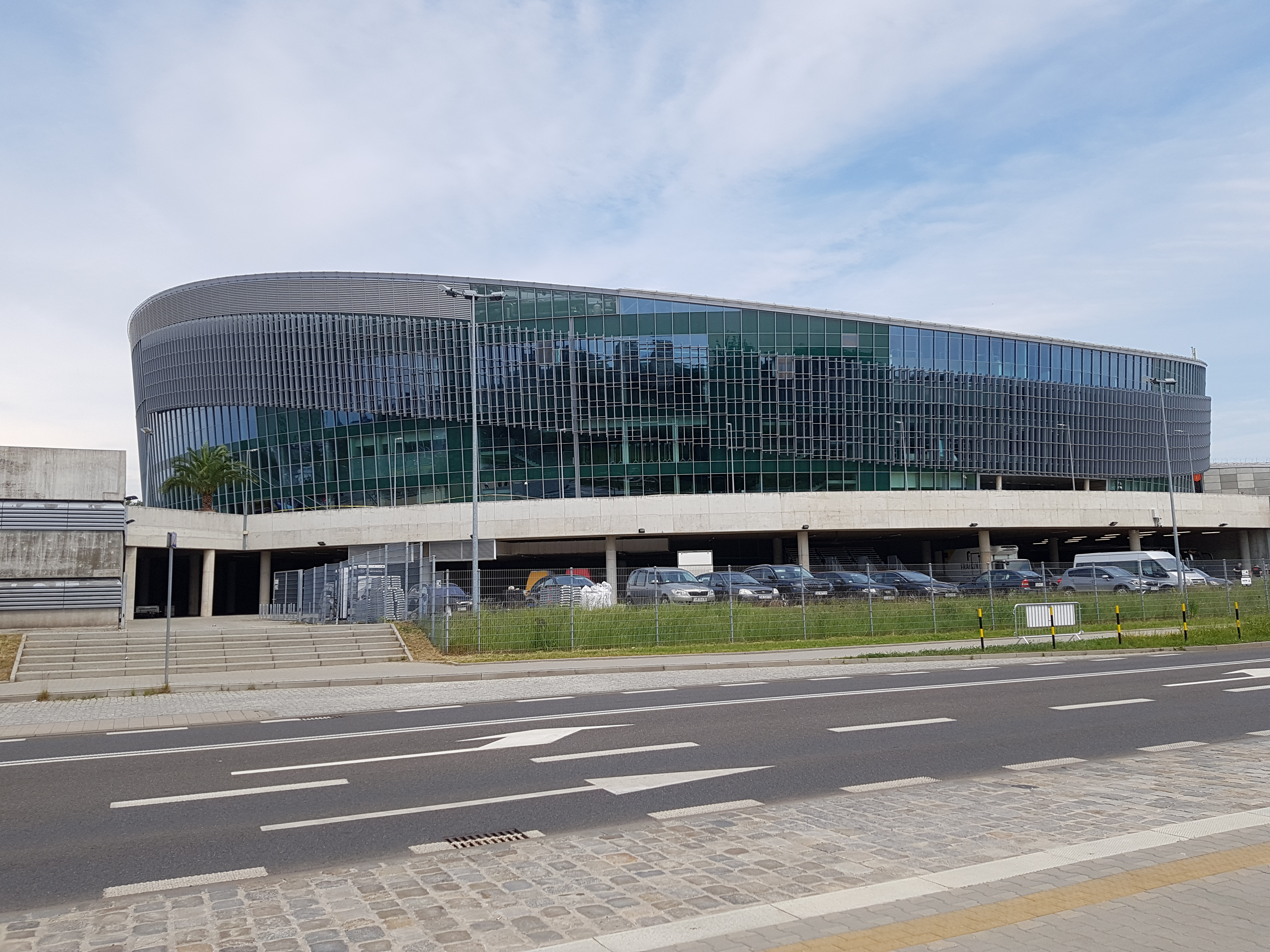
Car park of Gliwice Arena in 2021

Construction of the arena began in 2013 on the site of the former 20th Anniversary of the Polish People's Republic Stadium, following its demolition. The municipality initially expected to receive additional funding from the European Union, but the project was ultimately financed entirely from the city budget. Construction was originally scheduled for completion in mid-2015 at a cost of 321 million zł. According to a report on the implementation of the Gliwice city budget for 2017, total expenditure on the project in 2017 and 2018 amounted to 420.4 million zł (approximately €98 million), 31% more than originally anticipated. The main contractor was Mirbud S.A.

The arena complex includes a two-level car park with 800 spaces, the upper level of which can be adapted for events and outdoor exhibitions. The facility is accessible to people with disabilities and has 72 designated spaces, including 36 for wheelchair users and 36 for accompanying persons, located throughout the arena to provide good visibility. A training hall and a fitness building are located adjacent to the main arena. The building also contains Europe's highest climbing wall and a stage suspension system.

== Events ==
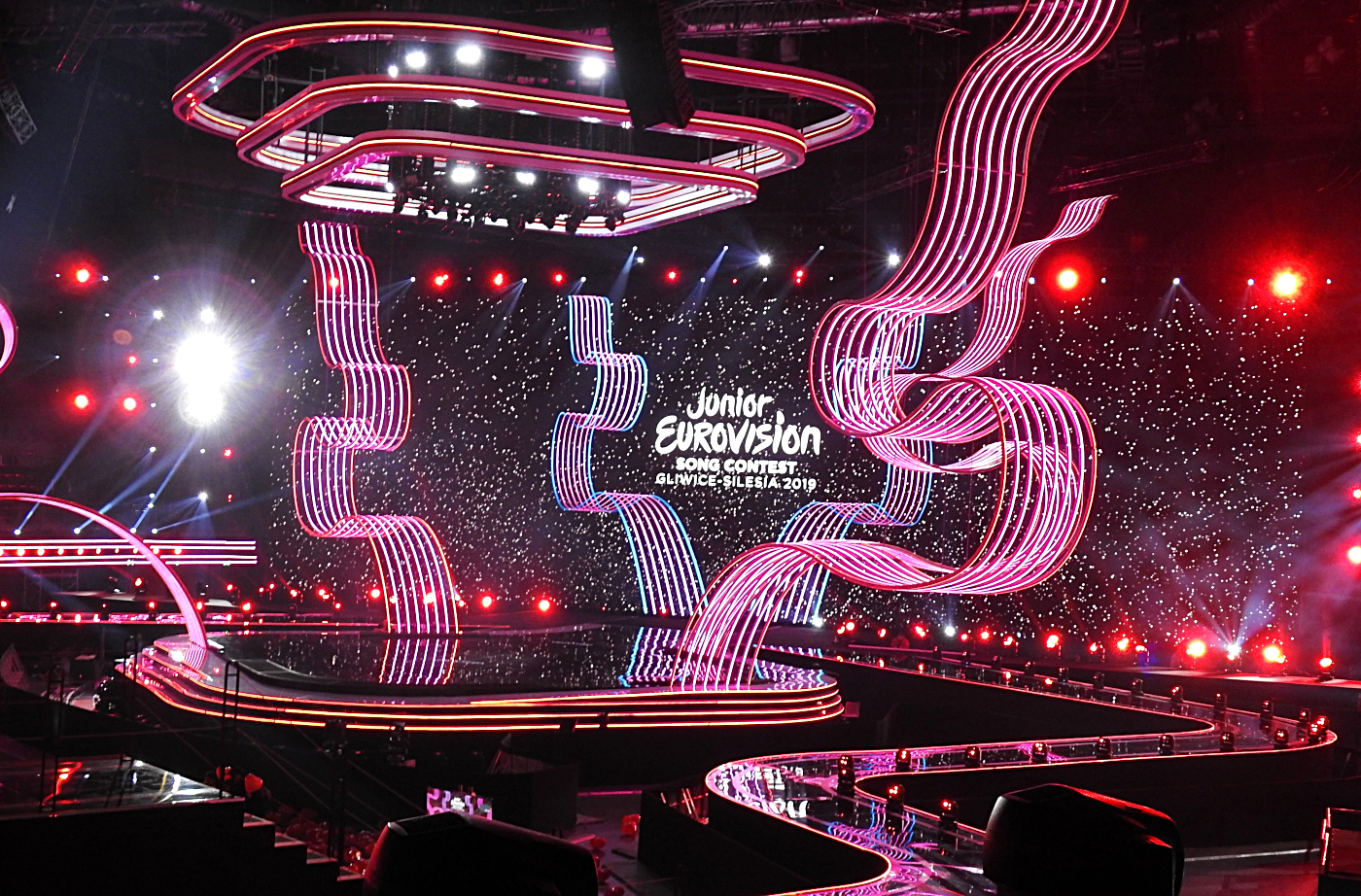
Stage of the Junior Eurovision Song Contest 2019

Before the arena's official opening, a women's run organised as part of the Bieg Kobiet Zawsze Pier(w)si initiative was held there on 6 May 2018 to raise awareness of breast cancer.

Gliwice Arena officially opened on 12 May 2018. Its first major event was an Armin van Buuren concert on the following 30 May.

The Junior Eurovision Song Contest 2019 was held at the venue on 24 November 2019. It subsequently hosted the knockout stages of both the 2022 FIVB Men's Volleyball World Championship and the 2022 FIVB Women's Volleyball World Championship.

== See also ==
- List of indoor arenas in Poland
- Sport in Poland

Preceded by Minsk-Arena; Minsk	Junior Eurovision Song Contest; Venue; 2019	Succeeded by TVP Headquarters; Warsaw
