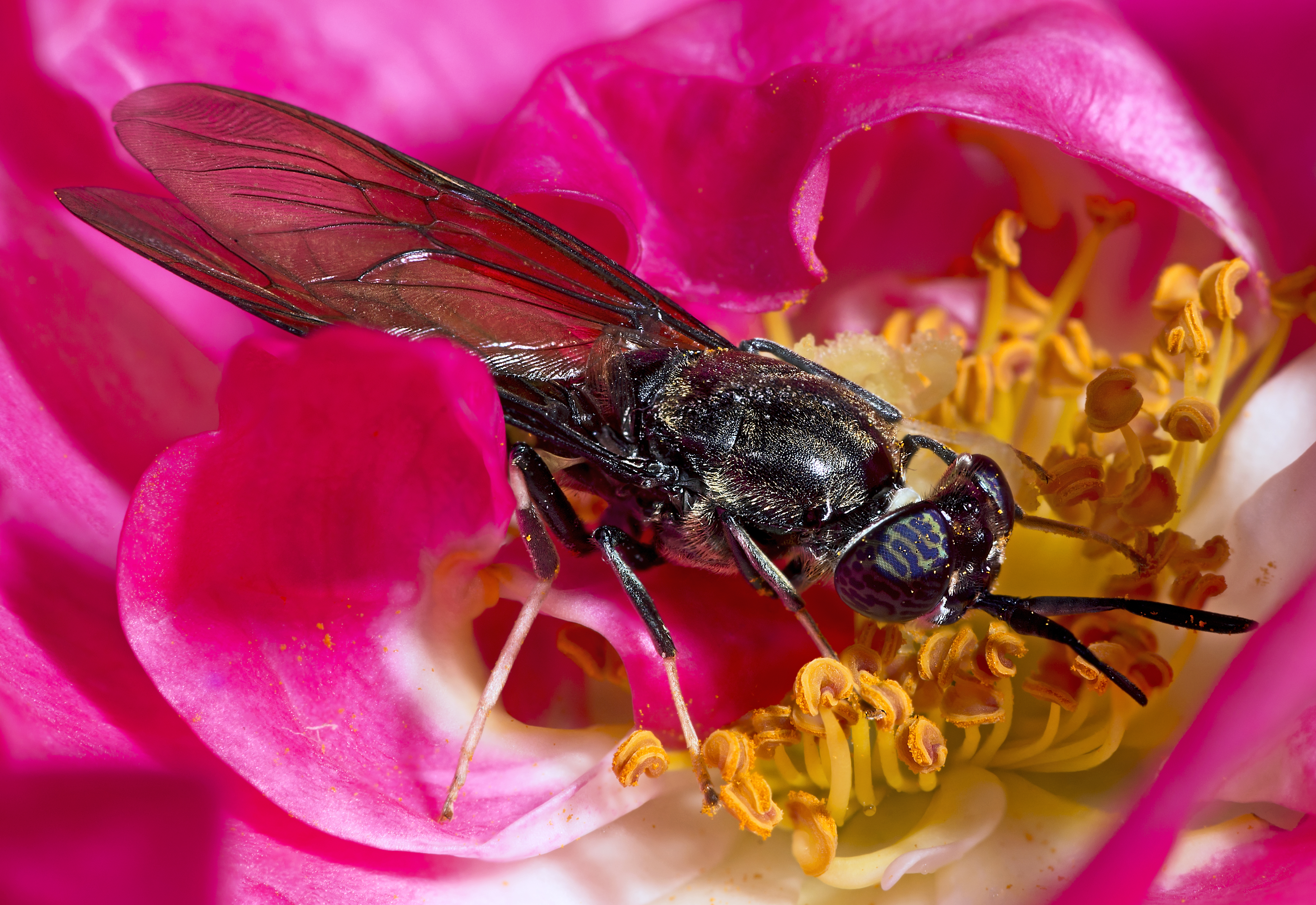
- Hermetia illucens on a rose

Scientific classification
- Kingdom: Animalia
- Phylum: Arthropoda
- Clade: Pancrustacea
- Class: Insecta
- Order: Diptera
- Family: Stratiomyidae
- Subfamily: Hermetiinae
- Genus: Hermetia
- Species: H. illucens

Binomial name
- Hermetia illucens (Linnaeus, 1758)

Synonyms
- List: Musca illucens Linnaeus, 1758; Musca leucopa Linnaeus, 1767; Hermetia rufiventris Fabricius, 1805; Hermetia nigrifacies Bigot, 1879; Hermetia pellucens Macquart, 1834; Hermetia mucens Riley & Howard, 1889; Hermetia illuscens Copello, 1926; Hermetia illucens var. nigritibia Enderlein, 1914

= Hermetia illucens =

Common and widespread fly of the family Stratiomyidae

Hermetia illucens, known colloquially as the black soldier fly, is a widespread fly of the family Stratiomyidae. Black soldier fly larvae are commonly utilized in composting systems due to their ability to rapidly break down food waste. In recent years, H. illucens has increasingly been gaining attention because of its hyperaccumulation of protein and fats via consumption of renewable substrates.

== Distribution ==
This species is native to the Neotropical realm, but in recent decades has spread across all continents, becoming virtually cosmopolitan.

It is present in parts of North America and Europe, including the Iberian Peninsula, southern France, Italy, Croatia, Malta, the Canary Islands, and Switzerland, and on the Black Sea coast of Russia in Krasnodar.

It can also be found in the Afrotropical realm, the Australasian realm, the east Palaearctic realm, the Nearctic realm, North Africa, Southern Africa, and the Indomalayan realm, including South Asia such as India and Pakistan.

== Description ==
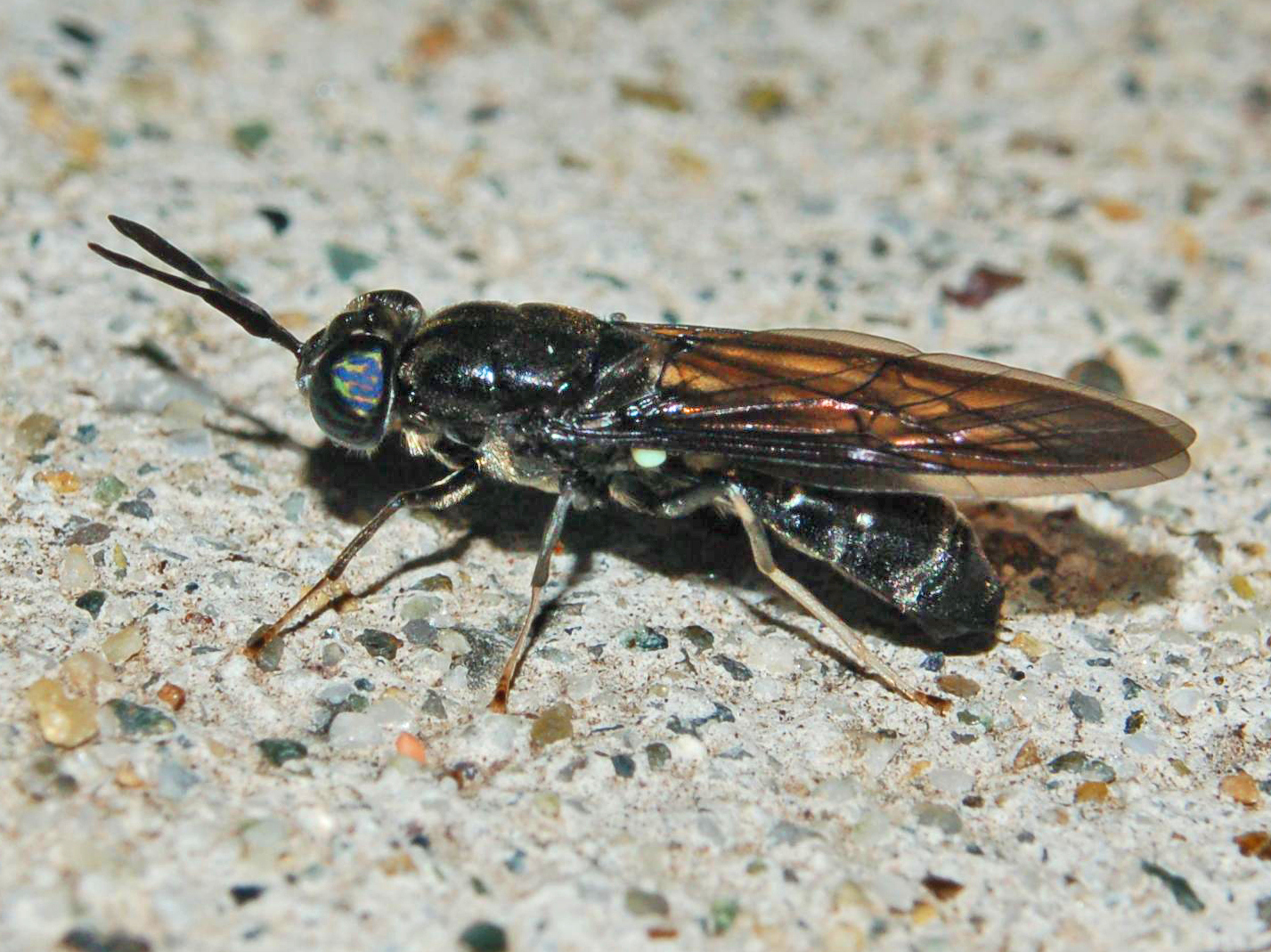
Adult of Hermetia illucens, side view

The adults of H. illucens measure about 16 millimetres (5/8 in) long. These medium-sized flies have a predominantly black body, with metallic reflections ranging from blue to green on the thorax and sometimes with a reddish end of the abdomen. The second abdominal tergite has translucent areas, from which the Latin specific epithet derives. The head is wide, with very developed eyes. The antennae are about twice the length of the head. The legs are black with whitish tarsi. The wings are membranous; at rest, they are folded horizontally on the abdomen and overlapped.

H. illucens is a mimic fly, very close in size, color, and appearance to the organ pipe mud dauber wasp and its relatives. The mimicry of this particular kind of wasp is especially enhanced by the fly's elongated and wasp-like antennae, pale hind tarsi, and the presence of two small, transparent "windows" in the basal abdominal segments that make the fly appear to have a narrow "wasp waist". Black soldier fly larvae can be differentiated from blowfly or housefly larvae by a thin gray-black stripe on their posterior ends.

== Lifecycle ==
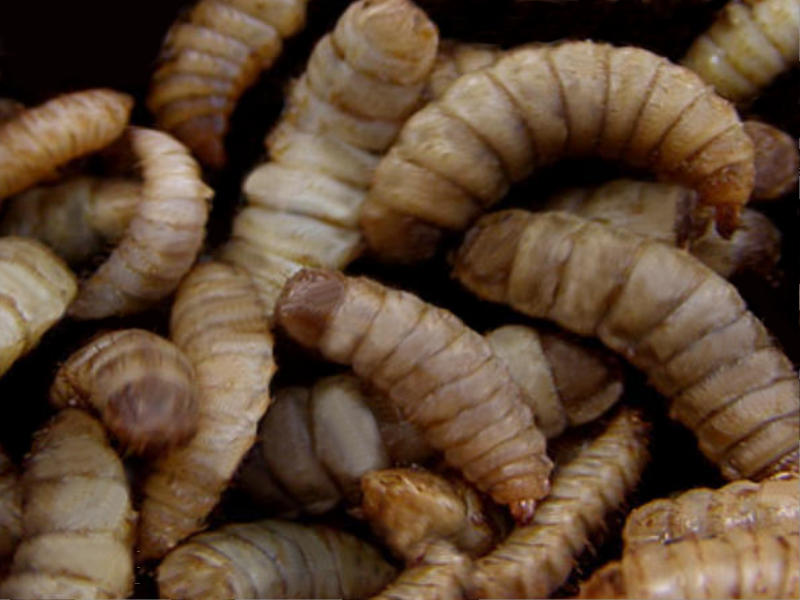
Black soldier fly larvae

An adult female lays approximately 200 to 600 eggs at a time. These eggs are typically deposited in crevices or on surfaces above or adjacent to decaying matter such as manure or compost, and hatch in about 4 days. Freshly emerged larvae are 1.0 millimetre (0.04 in) long, being able to reach a length of 25 millimetres (1 in) and weight of 0.10 to 0.22 grams (1.5 to 3.4 gr) by the end of larval stage. The larvae are able to feed on a wide variety of organic matter, adapting to diets with different nutrient content. Studies using artificial diets indicate that larval survival and bioconversion efficiency depend strongly on substrate hydration levels and macronutrient balance. The larval stage lasts from 18 to 36 days, depending on the food substrate provided to the larvae, of which the post-feeding (prepupal) stage lasts around 7 days. The larval stage can be prolonged by months due to low temperature or lack of food. The pupal stage lasts from 1 to 2 weeks. Adults can live typically 47 to 73 days when provided with water and food, such as sugar in captivity or nectar in the wild, or survive for about 8 to 10 days on fat reserves gathered during larval stage when water is provided.

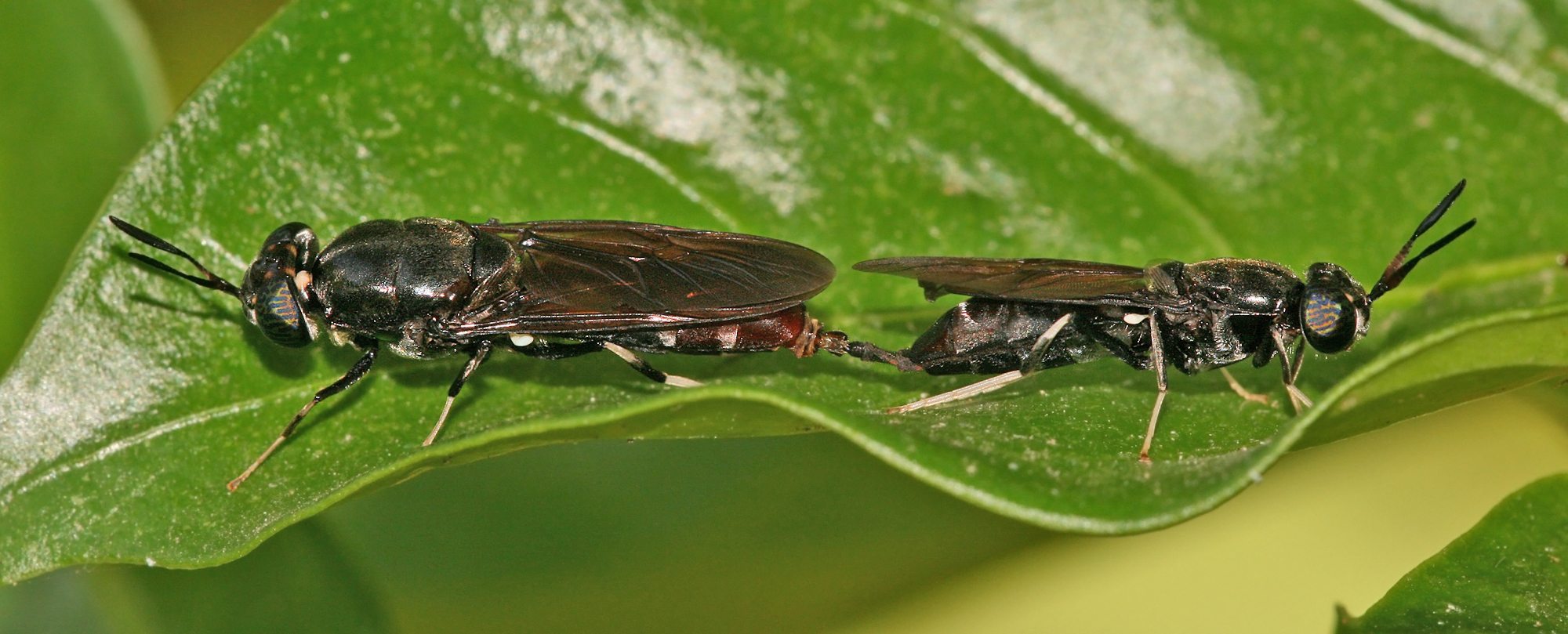
Black soldier flies mating

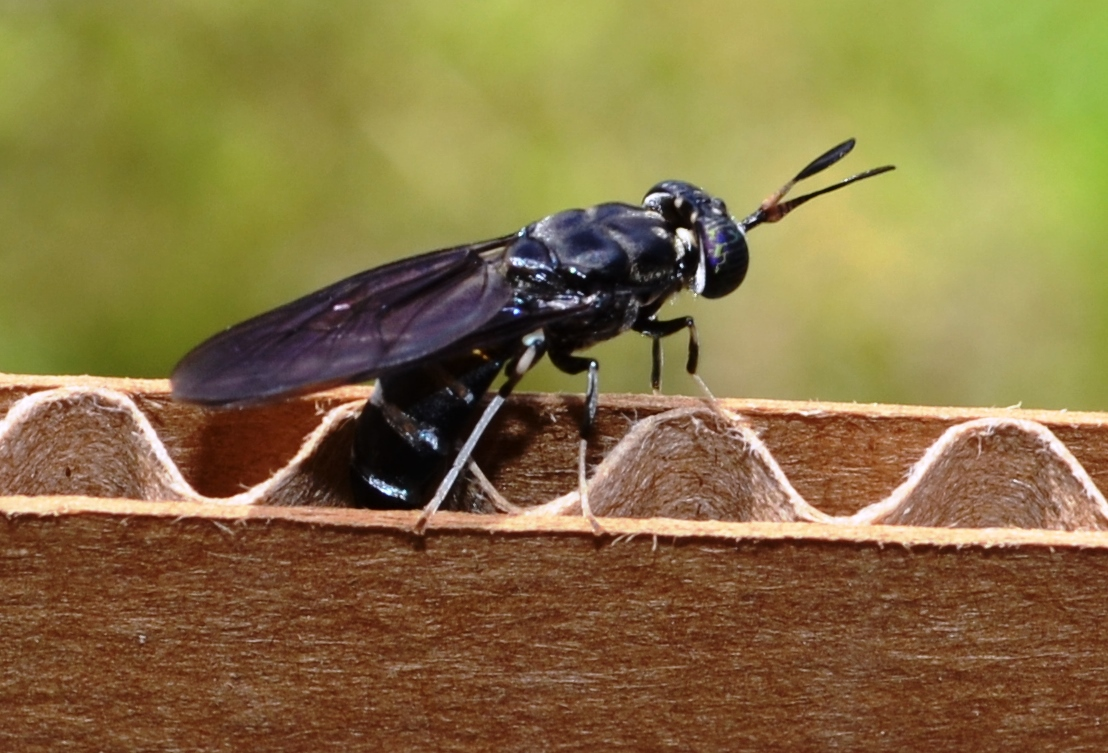
Black soldier fly depositing eggs in cardboard

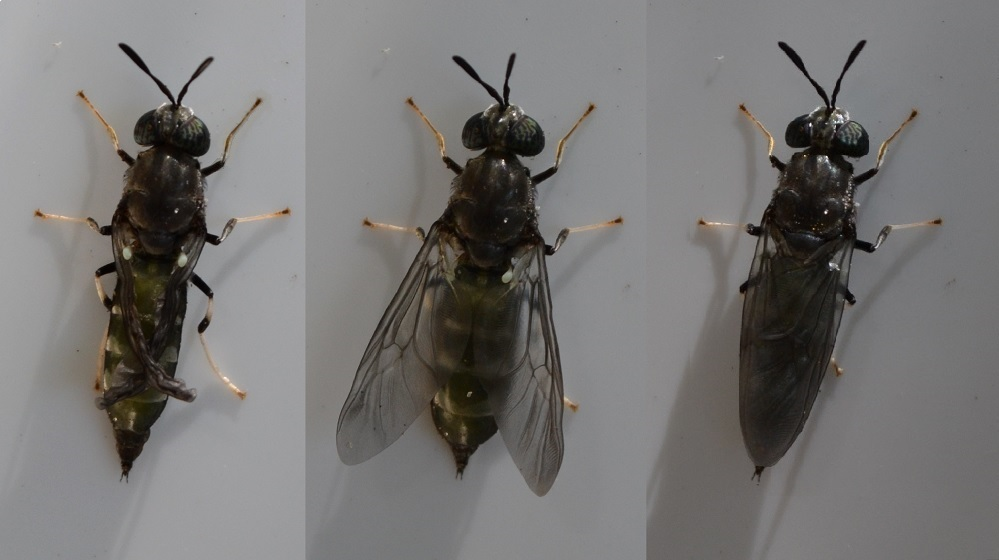
Black soldier fly inflating its wings during the first 15 minutes after emergence from pupation

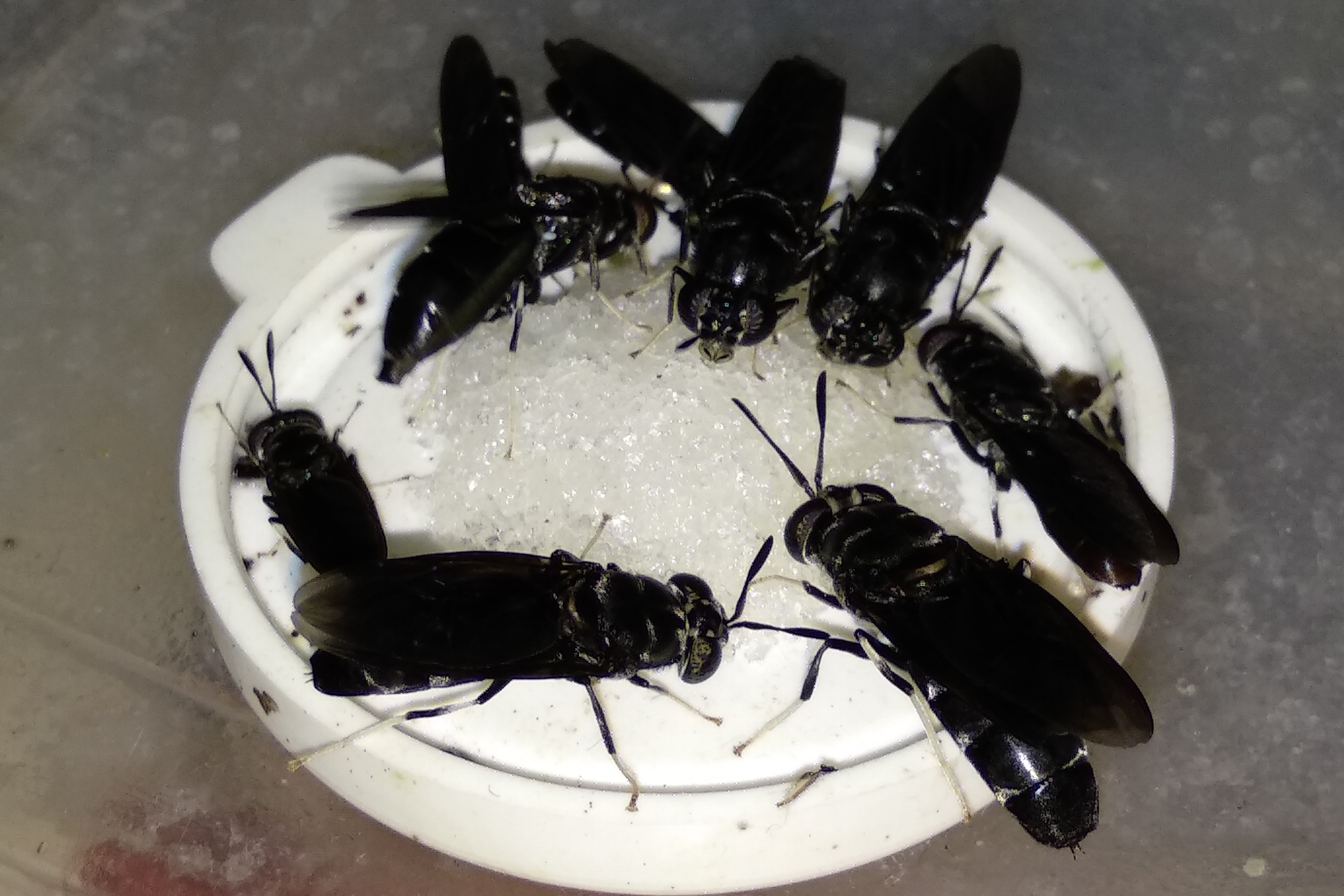
Black soldier flies feeding on sugar

== Human relevance and use ==
Neither larvae nor adults are considered to be agricultural pests or disease vectors. Black soldier fly larvae play a role similar to that of redworms as essential decomposers in breaking down organic substrates and returning nutrients to the soil. The larvae have voracious appetites and can be used for composting household food scraps and agricultural waste products.

Additionally, black soldier fly larvae are an alternative source of protein for aquaculture, animal feed, and pet food.

The larvae are produced and processed in industrial-scale insect factories globally by biotechnology companies such as LIVIN farms InnovaFeed, and Protix, the latter operating the world's largest insect factory farm in the Netherlands.

=== As decomposers in composting ===
Black soldier fly larvae (BSFL) are used to compost waste or convert the waste into animal feed. Waste streams include fresh manure and food wastes of both animal and vegetable origin. Fly larvae are among the most efficient animals at converting biomass into feed.

When the larvae have completed their larval development through six instars, they enter a stage called the "prepupa" wherein they cease to eat, and tend to migrate toward cool, dark, and dry substrates to pupate. This prepupal migration instinct is used by grub composting bins to self-harvest the mature larvae. These containers have ramps or holes on the sides to allow the prepupae to climb out of the composter and drop into a collection area.

The efficiency of organic waste conversion by black soldier fly larvae is influenced by their associated gut microbiota, including bacteria and fungi involved in nutrient degradation and metabolism. The composition of these microbial communities is shaped by both egg-associated microorganisms and microbes acquired from the feeding substrate. Supplementation with selected microbial strains or consortia has been investigated as a strategy to enhance larval growth and improve waste conversion efficiency.

Black soldier fly larvae are beneficial for use as composters in the following ways:

- Their large size relative to houseflies and blowflies allows BSFL to prevent houseflies and blowflies from laying eggs in decaying matter by consuming larvae of other species. This means compost systems inhabited by BSFL may be a more human-friendly way to handle food waste when compared to those inhabited by houseflies and blowflies which typically produce a much worse smell.
- They are not a pest to humans. Unlike houseflies, adult black soldier flies have greatly reduced sponging mouthparts, meaning they can only consume liquids such as flower nectar, although they typically do not eat at all. Unlike houseflies, which regurgitate food along with digestive enzymes, adult black soldier flies therefore do not spread pathogens or diseases.
- They are not attracted to human habitation or foods. As a detritivore and coprovore, the egg-bearing females are only attracted to rotting food or manure.
- Black soldier flies do not fly around as much as houseflies. They have less expendable energy due to their limited ability to consume food as adults. They are very easy to catch and relocate when they get inside a house, as they do not avoid being picked up, they are sanitary, and they neither bite nor sting. Their only defense seems to be hiding. When using a wet grub bin that collects or kills all the pupae, the black soldier fly population is easy to reduce by killing the pupae/prepupae in the collection container, before they become adult flies. They may be killed by freezing, drying, manually feeding to domestic animals, putting the collection container in a chicken coop for automatic feeding, or feeding to wild birds with a mouse/pest-proof feeder.
- Significant reductions of E. coli O157:H7 and Salmonella enterica were measured in hen manure after larvae were added to the manure.
- They quickly reclaim would-be pollutants: Nine organic chemicals were greatly reduced or eliminated from manure in 24 hours, making them a potential tool for bioremediation.
- They quickly reduce the volume and weight of waste: larval colonies break apart their food, churn it, and create heat, increasing compost evaporation. Significant amounts of waste are also converted to carbon dioxide respired by the grubs and symbiotic/mutualistic microorganisms. The use of BSFL in a compost system typically reduces the volume of compost by around 50%.

Aside from protein production, fly larvae also produce frass. Fly larval frass is a granulated and odorless residue that can be used as organic fertilizer directly or through conversion by earthworms.

=== As feed ===
Black soldier fly larvae are used as feed for pets and livestock animals. The harvested pupae and prepupae are eaten by poultry, fish, pigs, lizards, turtles, and even dogs. The insect is one of the few insect species approved to be used as feed in aquaculture in the EU.

At the pupal stage, black soldier flies are at their nutritional peak. They can be stored at room temperature for several weeks, and their longest shelf life is achieved at 10 to 16 °C (50 to 60 °F).

The sector faces financial challenges. In January 2025, Agronutris entered a safeguard procedure to restructure its debts and Ÿnsect was seeking a takeover. In November 2025, the largest insect farm in Northern Europe, Enorm Biofactory, went bankrupt, despite €55 million in funding.

A 2024 analysis indicated that the majority of investment in insect farming had been directed towards companies farming black soldier fly larvae (59% of disclosed investments). However, a significant proportion of these investments (around 36%) have gone to firms that have ceased operations or entered court-supervised restructuring. While investment growth was rapid prior to 2021, recent trends show a 65% decline between 2022 and 2024, reflecting a challenging investment environment.

=== As human food ===
Records of human consumption of H. illucens are difficult to find.

In 2013, Austrian designer Katharina Unger invented a table-top insect-breeding farm called "Farm 432" in which people can produce edible fly larvae at home. It is a multi-chambered plastic machine that looks like a kitchen appliance and can produce 500 grams (1.1 lb) of larvae or two meals in a week.

The taste of the larvae is said to be very distinctive. According to Unger, "when you cook them, they smell a bit like cooked potatoes. The consistency is a bit harder on the outside and like soft meat on the inside. The taste is nutty and a bit meaty.

=== For producing grease ===
BSFL can be used to produce grease, which is usable in the pharmaceutical industry (e.g. in cosmetics, surfactants for shower gel), thereby replacing vegetable oils such as palm oil. It can also be used in fodder.

=== For producing chitin ===
BSFL can be used to produce chitin. Chitin is used in shipping as an agent against biofouling. It is also used in water purification. Chitin also has potential as a soil amendment, to improve soil fertility and plant resilience.

=== For producing organic plant fertilizer ===
Material left over after the larval waste decomposition process (frass) consists of larval faeces, shed larval exoskeletons, and undigested material. Frass is one of the main products from commercial black soldier fly rearing. The chemical profile of the frass varies with the substrate on which the larvae feed, but in general, it is considered a versatile organic plant fertilizer due to a favorable ratio of three major plant nutrients: nitrogen, phosphorus, and potassium. BSFL frass is commonly applied by direct mixing with soil and considered a long-term fertilizer with slow nutrient release. Plant trials have also found short-term fertilizing effects comparable to fast-acting, synthetic fertilizers. In addition to its nutrient contribution, BSFL frass can carry further components that are beneficial for soil fertility and soil health, such as chitin from the shed exoskeletons of the larvae. Finally, the use of BSFL frass as a fertilizer can effectively alter the soil microbial community composition, which plays a crucial role for soil fertility.

Debate is going on whether the frass from BSFL rearing can be used as a fertilizer in a fresh state or has to undergo further composting before its application. Some assume that further composting would lead to the reduction of potential phytotoxic properties. In the European Union, insect frass has to be treated for one hour at 70 °C (158 °F) before commercialization for safety reasons, the same as other animal manure products.

However, a 2024 life cycle assessment commissioned by the UK Department for Environment, Food and Rural Affairs (DEFRA) concluded that the environmental impact and safety of frass at a large scale remain unknown due to a lack of standardisation, field-scale trials, and data on nitrogen behaviour.

=== In bioremediation ===
Recent research in the field of entomoremediation shows the potential of this insect for purification of biomass contaminated with heavy metals. Larvae of H. illucens were used in a bioremediation experiment, in which they consumed up to 49% of dry weight corn leaves polluted with cadmium or zinc, for 36 days. Artificially polluted corn leaves were used as a model plant material comparable to plant biomass polluted as a result of phytoextraction. The 49% loss of polluted dry weight material is a better result than in the case of composting alone, which is one of the standard proposed pretreatments for biomass polluted after phytoextraction. The type of heavy metal did not affect the degree of consumption in this experiment. Cadmium mostly accumulates in the puparium, while zinc accumulates in the adult fly. Black soldier fly larvae and their associated gut microbiota can contribute to the reduction of pathogenic microorganisms and degradation of veterinary pharmaceutical residues during organic waste processing. These processes involve antimicrobial peptides, fatty acids, and microbial activity, although the potential persistence and dissemination of antibiotic resistance genes remain important biosafety concerns.

=== Potential source of plastic-degrading enzymes and bacteria ===
It has been stated that H. illucens larval gut microbiota represent an optimal ecological niche for isolating enzymes and microbial strains with optimized plastic-degrading ability.

=== Potential use in biodiesel production ===
H. illucens could be a feasible feedstock for biodiesel production.

=== Farming ===
==== Larval colonies ====
The main difficulty in farming black soldier fly larvae (BSFL) comes when obtaining larvae or eggs to start or replenish the colony. This is usually done by enticing the soldier flies to lay eggs in small holes over a grub bin. Adult flies lay clusters of eggs in the edges of corrugated cardboard or corrugated plastic. In some regions, starting or maintaining adequate larvae colonies is possible from wild black soldier flies, but pest species such as houseflies and blowflies are also drawn to many of the foods used to attract soldier flies, such as fermented chicken feed.

In tropical or subtropical climates, black soldier fly adults might breed year-round, but in other climates, a greenhouse may be needed to obtain eggs in the cooler periods. Black soldier fly larvae are quite hardy and can handle more acidic conditions and higher temperatures than redworms. Larvae can survive cold winters, particularly with large numbers of larvae, insulation, or compost heat (generated by the microorganisms in the grub bin or compost pile). Heat stimulates the larvae to crawl off, pupate, and hatch, and a great deal of light and heat seem to be required for breeding. Many small-scale BSFL farmers start their larval colonies from eggs deposited by wild soldier flies.

==== Space and shape ====
Newly emerged soldier flies perform the beginning of their mating ritual in flight. The male grabs onto the female, and then grasps the female's ovipositor with his genitals. They mate while stationary and connected.

German scientists have successfully bred soldier flies in a space as small as 10 liters.

==== Heat ====
Adults typically mated and oviposited at temperatures of 24 to 40 °C (75 to 104 °F) or more. Around 99.6% of oviposition in the field occurred at 27.5 to 37.5 °C (81.5 to 99.5 °F).

==== Light ====
Quartz-iodine lamps have been successfully used to stimulate mating of adults. In particular, mating success of reared black soldier fly can be dramatically increased by exposing the adults to light that is particularly rich in wavelengths near 440 and/or 540 nm and has an irradiance that is an appreciable fraction of the intensity of full sunlight. In tropical conditions, morning direct sunlight is optimal for emergence, mating, and egg laying, with indirect sunlight often preferred before and after mating.

==== Humidity ====
Humidity at 70% is considered optimal for all stages of their lifecycle.

Substrate was found to be unnecessary for pupation, but substrate is thought to act as a regulator for humidity, which prevents desiccation. A 93% emergence rate was observed when humidity was held at 70%.

==== Black soldier fly larvae and redworms ====
Redworm farmers often report black soldier fly larvae in their worm bins. Black soldier fly larvae are better at quickly converting "high-nutrient" waste into animal feed, while redworms are better at converting high-cellulose materials (paper, cardboard, leaves, plant materials except wood) into an excellent soil amendment.

Redworms thrive on the residue produced by black soldier fly larvae, but larvae leachate ("tea") contains harmful enzymes and tends to be too acidic for worms. The activity of larvae can keep temperatures around 37 °C (99 °F), while redworms require cooler temperatures. Most attempts to raise large numbers of larvae with redworms in the same container, at the same time, are unsuccessful. Worms have been able to survive in/under grub bins with bottoms that open into the ground. Redworms can live in grub bins when a large number of black soldier fly larvae are not present. Worms can be added if the larval population gets low (in the cold season) and worms can be raised in grub bins while awaiting eggs from wild black soldier flies.

As a feeder species, BSFL are not known to be intermediate hosts of parasitic worms that infect poultry, while redworms are host to many such species.

==== Names and trademarks ====
BSFL were developed as a feeder insect for exotic pets by D. Craig Sheppard, who named the larvae Phoenix Worms and began marketing them as pet food. In 2006, Phoenix Worms became the first feeder insect to be granted a U.S. registered trademark. Other companies also market BSFL under such brand names as Usefullfly Chengdu (UAE-CHINA), NutriGrubs, Soldier Grubs, Reptiworms, Calciworms, BIOgrubs, and Obie's Worms (Canada), Zeronix (Russia), Polezniye Biotechnologiy (Russia) ). In Africa, they are marketed as live feeder, meal and oil by ProtiCycle for animal feed, pet food for dogs and cats, and food for fish such as tilapia and catfish.

== Possible natural enemies ==
In West Africa, Dirhinus giffardii has been found to be a parasitoid of H. illucens pupae and can decrease egg production, reducing stocks by up to 72%. The parasite is carried by the wasps and precautions should be taken to protect the larvae from exposure to these wasps. Also the Chalcididae Eniacomorpha hermetiae has been described as a parasitoid of H. illucens that may negatively impact efforts of mass production in Africa.

== See also ==
- Black fly
- Insect farming
- Insects as feed
