= Ÿnsect =

Insect farming company

- Founded: 4 October 2011
- Founder: Antoine Hubert; Jean-Gabriel Levon; Fabrice Berro; Alexis Angot
- Defunct: 1 December 2025
- Headquarters: Évry, Essonne, France
- Key people: Emmanuel Pinto (CEO, 2025)
- Revenue: €3,228,100 (2022)
- Net income: -€89,669,900 (2022)
- Website: https://ynsect.com

Ÿnsect was a French company that produced insect-based proteins and fertilizers. Founded in 2011 in Paris, it was placed into judicial liquidation in December 2025.

== History ==
In 2011, Ÿnsect was founded by four scientists and environmental activists: Antoine Hubert (AgroParisTech), Jean-Gabriel Levon (HEC Paris, Polytechnique), Fabrice Berro (Ensimag), and Alexis Angot (ESSEC).

In February 2014, Ÿnsect completed its first fundraising round, raising €1.8 million from shareholders such as Emertec Gestion and Demeter Partners. The group's first farm was established in Dole in 2015.

In 2018, Ÿnsect announced the installation of a new production site in Poulainville, in the Amiens metropolitan area, France. The vertical giga-farm planned to cover 45,000 m².

In 2019, the company joined the Next40 index.

In June 2020, Ÿnsect became the first company in the world to obtain authorization to market a natural insect-based fertilizer, granted by ANSES. In October 2020, the company announced that it had completed its Series C, bringing its total funding to $425 million.

In March 2021, Ÿnsect was awarded B Corp certification. In April 2021, Ÿnsect acquired Protifarm, a Dutch company, and expanded its patent portfolio to more than 340 patents across 41 patent families. This acquisition was part of the company's strategy to enter the insect-based human food market.

In February 2022, Ÿnsect announced the launch of Ÿnfabre, the first industrial genomic selection program applied to large-scale insect farming. In 2021, as part of its Terrha 2040 project, Ÿnsect committed to planting 1.8 million trees in the Hauts-de-France region, with the goal of sequestering more than 190,000 tons of CO2 by 2040. In May 2021, Ÿnsect held the groundbreaking ceremony for its Amiens construction site.

The consequences of the COVID-19 pandemic on global supply chains, followed by the economic impact of Russia's invasion of Ukraine, led to an increase in the company's costs, which doubled between 2022 and 2023, and affected the commissioning of the Poulainville site. The group then refocused on animal feed to improve its margins. In November 2021, Ÿnsect launched a partnership with the startup Pure Simple True to produce luxury dog treats marketed under the brand Bernie's. In November 2021, Ÿnsect also signed an agreement with Lotte's R&D center in Korea.

In March 2022, Ÿnsect announced the acquisition of its first production site in the United States. The integration of Jord Producers marked its entry into the backyard chicken feed market. This site was closed two years later.

At the beginning of 2023, the company raised €160 million in a Series D round from existing shareholders, including €107 million in convertible bonds. This fundraising was accompanied by layoffs affecting just over 20% of its workforce in offices located in Paris and the Netherlands, due to the closure of a production site. The startup was then valued at more than €600 million. In July 2023, CEO Antoine Hubert stepped down from his position. He was replaced by Shankar Krishnamoorthy.

Following a series of setbacks in the industrialization of its technology and a change in its business model, the company was placed under safeguard proceedings on September 26, 2024.

On February 17, 2025, the application deadline, no takeover or investment offers had been submitted to the commercial court, raising fears of an unfavorable outcome for the future of the company, which had raised €600 million over 14 years. The company was placed into judicial reorganization on March 3, 2025. According to Ynsect's spokesperson, the group would face a cash-flow dead end by the end of March 2025. In April 2025, the company obtained an additional €10 million from its existing shareholders in order to maintain "production and customer deliveries, and discussions with potential investors." Emmanuel Pinto was appointed CEO. In June 2025, Ÿnsect announced the elimination of nearly 70% of its 200 jobs.

On December 1, 2025, the Evry commercial court ordered the company's judicial liquidation. The Dole site was then taken over by Keprea, a company founded by former Ÿnsect CEO Antoine Hubert.

=== Criticism of the use of public funds ===
Following the liquidation of Ÿnsect, several politicians have criticized the amount of public funding granted to the company. French MP François Ruffin described Ÿnsect as "a textbook example of public money being thrown out the window" and called for an investigation to assess the use of public aid and the responsibilities linked to the failure of the industrial project, particularly at the Amiens site. According to the Ministry of Economy and Finance, the company received €148 million in public funding out of a total investment of €600 million. This amount covers 2012 to 2025 and includes about €8 million in grants and €76 million in equity and convertible bonds under the Investments for the Future programme (PIA) and France 2030.

A parliamentary inquiry commission is being discussed and supported by Alain Gest, LR president of the Amiens metropolitan area, to determine the exact causes of the company's bankruptcy. In February 2026, around 40 employees gathered around their employee representative on the Social and Economic Committee (CSE) to demand accountability from their former management, contesting their redundancy.

== Products ==
=== Insects ===
After five years of R&D, the co-founders chose beetles, in particular the mealworm (Tenebrio molitor). Its composition of 70% protein (compared with 30% to 40%, for example, in the black soldier fly) makes it a premium ingredient.

=== Fertilizer ===
On June 17, 2020, Ÿnsect received authorization to place its natural insect-based fertilizer, "Ynfrass," on the market. This authorization, issued by ANSES, allows the company to become the first player in the world to obtain market approval for a natural insect-based fertilizer.

=== Animal feed ===
Ÿnsect markets products used in animal nutrition under the brand Pet Food Spryng.

=== Food for humans ===
The Ÿnsect Human Nutrition & Health business unit produces ingredients derived from the farming of buffalo worm larvae (Alphitobius diaperinus).

== Economic model malfunctions ==
Ynsect's bankruptcy is part of a broader context of difficulties encountered by the insect food industry, which has seen several companies in the sector struggle. Among them, Scandinavian leader Enorm Biofactory, which raised €55 million, and Aspire Food Group in Canada, which raised €42 million, have also faced bankruptcy or major restructuring.

Several economic factors have had a negative impact on the sector's development. Insect meal, a key product in this economic model, is 2 to 10 times more expensive than other alternatives such as fish meal or soybean meal. In addition, the human food market, which had been explored by some players in the sector, faces low consumer acceptance. Furthermore, efforts to feed insects with organic waste have proven problematic. Health regulations limit the use of certain types of waste, and their variability in terms of composition leads to growth delays or higher mortality rates among insects. In response to these challenges, Ynsect has turned to agricultural by-products, such as wheat bran, which are already used in animal feed. However, this approach raises several questions: these materials are not waste, which makes them compete with other existing uses, and their cost is high, which calls into question the economic viability and environmental benefits initially promised.

Health and safety issues have also been reported at the company's production sites. In January 2026, an investigation revealed hazardous conditions at the Poulainville factory, with employees reporting health problems linked to the presence of flies, spider webs, and rodent carcasses. In addition, a further investigation highlighted the presence of large numbers of moths and spiders at the Damparis plant, highlighting a systemic problem at Ynsect's production sites.
