= Insect-based pet food =

Insect-based pet food is pet food consisting of, or containing insects digestible by pets such as dogs or cats. A limited, but growing number of products are available on the market, including insect-based cat food, dog food, and pet treats.

The process of consuming insects by animals (as well as humans) is called entomophagy.

== Background and potential ==
There are many benefits to using insects in pet goods, including implications for the environment and sustainability. There is potential for growth in the pet food industry, with many insect species having the ability to be used as a novel protein source. There are also alternate uses for insects, such as control of hypertension and antioxidant properties.

=== Environment and sustainability ===
As global populations rise, food demand is becoming an increasingly important issue. Raising conventional livestock requires resources such as land and water, of which availability is concurrently decreasing. As a result, the ability to meet the needs of the growing population may require alternative sources of quality protein. As the global population rises, there is an increasing demand for animal-based proteins that will require the use of alternative and sustainable sources for pet food as well. Pets play an important role in society, providing companionship and support, and owning pets has been linked to reduced incidence of heart disease, stress and depression. The popularity of pet ownership is increasing, and with this is a trend of humanization. People are increasingly demanding pet food ingredients that they believe are healthy. This creates a competition with the human food chain for quality protein sources. Producing insect protein through other agricultural practices requires considerably less resources than traditional livestock. The production of insects also produces lower greenhouse gases and ammonia than traditional livestock species. Insects also have the ability to feed on organic waste products such as vegetable, restaurant and animal waste, therefore reducing the amount of excess food produced by humans. Insects are very efficient at converting feed into protein, as they require less feed than traditional livestock. Furthermore, water conservation is also accomplished as insects are cold-blooded and are able to meet water requirements through their feed. Thus, insects may be an acceptable source of protein for pets. To learn more about sustainability of insect rearing, see Insect farming.

=== Insects as a novel protein source for pet food ===
A challenge that is presented when feeding companion animals with food intolerance or sensitivities is finding protein sources that will not irritate their gastrointestinal tracts. Animal protein is a major cause of gastrointestinal problems, and insect protein may be an alternative source for these pets. Insects have the potential to be used as a novel protein in diets for sensitive animals. A novel protein is a protein source to which the animal has not previously been exposed. There are some risks to using novel protein sources, such as contaminants, antinutritional factors (ANFs), and allergens which are not well known. When referring specifically to dog and cat nutrition, the use of alternative protein sources must be able to deliver the ten essential amino acids (EAA) that are not synthesized from the body (including Arg, His, Ile, Leu, Lys, Met, Phe, Thr, Trp and Val). One additional amino acid which is specific to cats who are obligate carnivores by nature is taurine. This requirement is based on the low enzymatic action of cysteine dioxygenase and cysteine sulphinic acid decarboxylase within feline metabolism, where the competing pathway of pyruvate for an energy source overrides taurine synthesis. McCuster et al. created a study to identify amino acid composition of different insects, specifically addressing the presence of taurine in comparison to the National Research Council's (NRC) minimal requirements (MR) for the dog and cat. This study titled Amino acid content of selected plant, algae and insect species: a search for alternative protein sources for use in pet foods was published in 2014 in the Journal of Nutritional Science and provided the following table of data:

Insect	CP (%DM)	Arg	His	Ile	Leu	Lys	Met	Phe	Tau	Thr	Trp	Val
American cockroach (Periplaneta americana)	95.8	33.71	15.41	18.81	35.86	34.91	8.90	19.68	1.10	21.01	4.71	30.99
Flesh fly, larva (Sarcophaga (Neobelliaria) bullata)	65.8	35.69	23.47	27.40	44.86	56.14	15.96	40.62	0.92	27.15	8.93	35.46
Western harvester ant (Pogonomyrmexoccidentalis)	66.3	25.72	15.13	30.33	46.92	28.42	8.03	16.15	6.42	24.36	NA	37.94
Flesh fly, adult (Sarcophaga (Neobelliaria) bullata)	78.6	44.27	24.88	32.05	51.80	61.36	19.91	32.37	3.33	29.00	9.00	40.39
Black soldier fly, larva (Hermetia illucens)	46.7	23.25	15.60	17.30	28.75	28.57	6.94	16.00	0.19	16.54	6.26	26.01
NRC MR Canine for growth	18.0	6.3	3.1	5.2	10.3	7.0	2.8	5.2	NR	6.5	1.8	5.4
NRC MR Feline for growth	18.0	7.7	2.6	4.3	10.2	6.8	3.5	4.0	0.32	5.2	1.3	5.1

- CP, Crude protein; NRC MR, National Research Council Minimal Requirement; NR, not required (taurine not an essential amino acid in the dog); NA, not adequate sample for analysis
- Amino acids measured on a mg/g DM basis

The results demonstrated that all evaluated insects met the canine and feline MR for growth of the NRC for EAA and CP with exception to the black soldier fly in regards to taurine, where composition was lower than recommended.

== Regulations for pet food ingredients ==
Aside from the CFIA, which makes the use of specified risk materials illegal, pet food ingredients do not need to be approved by any regulatory body in Canada. However, if manufacturers plan to expand into the U.S. market, they must adhere to regulations imposed by each state, or comply with guidelines established by the American Association of Feed Control Officials (AAFCO). These guidelines will provide country-wide acceptable ingredients, and nutritional recommendations based on research collected by the National Research Council (NRC). As of August 2021, AAFCO has approved the use of Black Soldier Fly (BSF) insects in pet food - specifically for adult dogs.

The use of insects in feed in the European Union was previously prohibited under an act called "TSE Regulation" (Article 7 and Annex IV of Regulation 999/2001) that bans the use of animal protein in animal feed. In July 2017 this regulation was revised and partially lifts the ban on animal proteins, allowing insects to be included in fish feed. This was coupled with another change that reclassified insects in the European Union (EU) catalogue of feed materials. This change specifically refers to fats and proteins from insects instead of classifying them under a broad title of animal products. Due to this change, producers now must list the species and life stage of the insect on their product. Novel pet food ingredients in Europe must also follow certain stringent regulations, making approval of new ingredients a lengthy process. Novel ingredients must undergo scientific assessment before being considered safe for consumption, and a safety assessment report must be completed for ingredient authorization. In addition, all pet food animal products must be considered fit for human food consumption, a measure put into place to prevent the spread of zoonotic diseases, and plants that will be manufacturing the pet food must be authorized under two of the EU legislature bodies. To learn more about labelling and regulations of pet food, see Pet food.

== Challenges and safety concerns ==
In spite of all the advantages that insect protein are provided, there are some potential challenges caused by production and safety concerns.

Mass production in the insect industry is a concern due to a lack of technology and funds to efficiently harvest, and produce insects. The machinery would have to house proper enclosure for each life cycle of the insect as well as the temperature control as that is key for insect development.

The industry also has to consider the shelf life of insects in companion animal products as some can have food safety concerns. Insects have the capability of accumulating potential hazards, such as contaminants, pathogens, heavy metals, allergens, and pesticides etc.

The table below combines the data from two studies and summarizes the potential hazards of the top five insect species consumed by humans.

Insect type	Common name	Hazard category	Potential hazard
Coleoptera	Beetle	Chemical	Hormones
Coleoptera	Beetle	Chemical	Cyanogentic substances
Coleoptera	Beetle	Chemical	Heavy metal contamination
Lepidoptera	Silkworm	Allergic	
Lepidoptera	Silkworm	Chemical	Thiaminase
Lepidoptera	Honeycomb moth	Microbial	High bacterial count
Lepidoptera	Honeycomb moth	Chemical	Cyanogentic substances
Hymenoptera	Ant	Chemical	Antinutritional factors (tannin, phytate)
Orthoptera	House cricket	Microbial	High bacterial count
Hemipetera		Parasitical (other)	Chagas disease
Diptera	Black soldier fly	Parasitical (self)	Myiasis

These hazards in insects can be controlled in various ways. Allergic hazards can be labelled on the packaging to avoid consumption by susceptible consumers. Selective farming can be used to minimize chemical hazards, whereas microbial and parasitical hazards can be controlled by cooking processes.

== Insect-based pet food products on the market ==
As of August 5, 2021, AAFCO (Association of American Feed Control Officials) has voted to include adult dogs in the ingredient definition for whole dried black soldier fly larvae and black soldier fly larvae meal. This approval allows for the sale of BSF based dog food and treats in the United States. As of June 2023, according to a review of the market by leading BSF producer Protix there are over 43 brands worldwide marketing insect-based pet foods. 35 of these are in Europe. An example of a European brand developing complete dog and cat diets and treats using BSF in European, Asian and North American markets is YORA, another example of a brand making BSF treats in the US and Canada is ALT-PRO Advantage (formerly known as HOPE Pet Food).
