= Protix =

Manufacturer and supplier of insect ingredients

- Company type: Private company
- Website type: Insect industry
- Founded: 2009; 17 years ago
- Headquarters: 's Hertogenbosch (North Brabant), Netherlands
- CEO: Kees Aarts
- Website: protix.com
- Commercial: Yes

Protix is a multinational manufacturer and supplier of insects for animal feed, for livestock and for aquaculture . The company operates the world's largest insect factory, located in Bergen op Zoom in the Netherlands.

== History ==
The company was founded in 2009 by the CEO Kees Aarts. Protix is headquartered in 's Hertogenbosch, Netherlands.

In June 2017, the company raised €45 million in funding, at that time the largest investment in the industry. In October 2017, Protix acquired Fair Insects, a company focused on breeding insects for human consumption.

In June 2019, Protix opened a new site in Bergen op Zoom, which is the largest insect factory in the world.

Although a potential €37 million loan under the InvestEU programme had been considered to support the construction of a plant in Poland, the European Investment Bank (EIB) stated that the loan was cancelled without any disbursement and that it is no longer involved in the project. In February 2025, the company acknowledged that its industrial plant project in Poland had been put on hold.

On 4 August 2026, Wakker Dier filed a complaint against Protix over alleged misleading sustainability claims.

On 5 August 2026, a protest took place in front of the headquarters of Invest-NL, which has invested in Protix. The protestors want to prevent more public tax money going to Protix by raising awareness on sustainability issues surrounding insect farming.
