= Prezero =

German waste management company

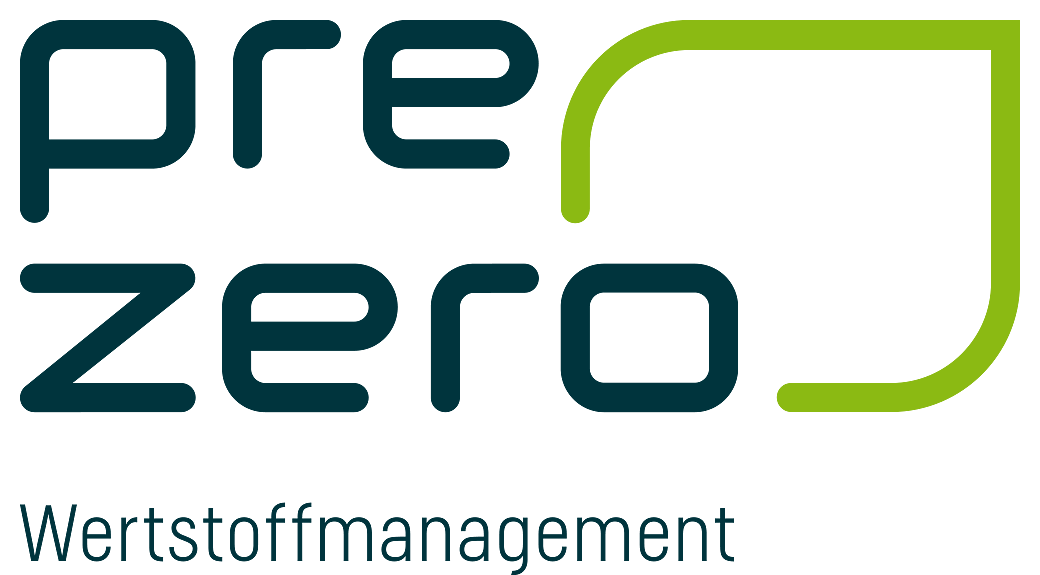
- Industry: Waste management, recycling
- Founded: 2018; 8 years ago
- Headquarters: Neckarsulm, Germany
- Revenue: 3.1 billion euros (2023/24)
- Number of employees: 24,234 (2023/24)
- Website: prezero-international.com

PreZero Stiftung & Co. KG (written as PreZero) is a German environmental services provider active in waste management in the areas of dual systems, disposal, recycling, packaging and recovery. Previously, it was known as GreenCycle Stiftung & Co. KG and GreenCycle Holding GmbH & Co. KG).

Based in Neckarsulm, the company is part of the Schwarz Group, which also includes Kaufland, Lidl, Schwarz Produktion and Schwarz Digits. PreZero has more than 460 locations in Germany, Belgium, Italy, Luxembourg, the Netherlands, Austria, Poland, Portugal and Spain.

== History ==
=== The origins ===
Founded in 2009, GreenCycle was originally responsible for waste disposal and recycling management within the Schwarz Group. Later GreenCycle began offering its expertise in waste disposal and recycling to external customers outside the Schwarz Group as a consultant.

=== Entry into the operational waste disposal business ===
In 2018, GreenCycle made its first acquisition in the operational waste disposal market with the US company RMG Recycling. This was followed in the same year by the acquisition of Tönsmeier, at that time Germany's fifth-largest waste disposal service provider. Tönsmeier was founded in 1927, introduced dust-free waste collection in 1958, expanded into the new federal states in the 1990s and opened a branch in Poland in 1996. Since the beginning of 2019, the Tönsmeier locations in Germany and Poland have been operating under the 'PreZero' brand.

=== Further expansion ===
Several company acquisitions followed in 2019 and 2020, leading to market entries in Italy, Austria and Sweden. The company also entered the aluminium recycling business. In September 2020, PreZero announced its intention to purchase the waste and recycling business of the French Suez Group in the Netherlands, Luxembourg, Germany, Poland and Sweden. The acquisition of Suez's waste and recycling business in these countries was successfully completed in June 2021.

Since 2021, the company has been manufacturing flexible plastic packaging, offering consulting services on sustainable packaging and developing the first official certification for sustainable waste management.

== Services ==
PreZero offers services along the entire value chain of the circular economy. These include the collection, sorting, processing and recycling of waste, as well as consulting on disposal and recycling processes.

Business areas

- Waste disposal, recycling
- Development of sustainable packaging solutions
- Licensing for sales packaging in the dual system
- Reusable load carriers and pooling services for logistics
- Environmental and circular economy
- Upcycling of agricultural by-products as a substitute for wood fibres

== Locations ==
=== Germany ===
- Neckarsulm (head office)
- Porta Westfalica (PreZero Deutschland KG)
- Wesseling (PreZero Service Deutschland GmbH)

In addition to the main locations, there are around 120 other locations in Germany, where approximately 4,800 employees work.

=== International ===
- Belgium: Evergem
- Italy: Fonte
- Luxembourg: Bettembourg
- Netherlands: Arnhem
- Austria: Haimburg
- Poland: Ruda Śląska
- Portugal: Leça do Balio
- Sweden: Helsingborg
- Spain: Madrid

== Partnerships ==
Since its foundation, PreZero has been working with the retail companies Lidl and Kaufland, which belong to the Schwarz Group. In January 2019, PreZero acquired the naming rights to the former Wirsol Rhein-Neckar-Arena in Sinsheim, which has since been renamed PreZero Arena. Other partnerships in this area include the Allianz Arena and SAP Garden in Munich, the MHPArena in Stuttgart, the Red Bull Arena in Leipzig, the SAP Arena in Mannheim and the Estadi Mallorca Son Moix in Palma de Mallorca, the German Handball Bundesliga and FC Bayern Munich Basketball.

== Criticism ==
In the districts of Esslingen and Zollernalbkreis, there were increasing problems with waste disposal from spring 2025 onwards. Defective vehicles and staff shortages were cited as the reasons for collections being delayed by more than a week in some cases. In both districts, criticism was voiced by both the responsible authorities and the population.
