= Insects as feed =

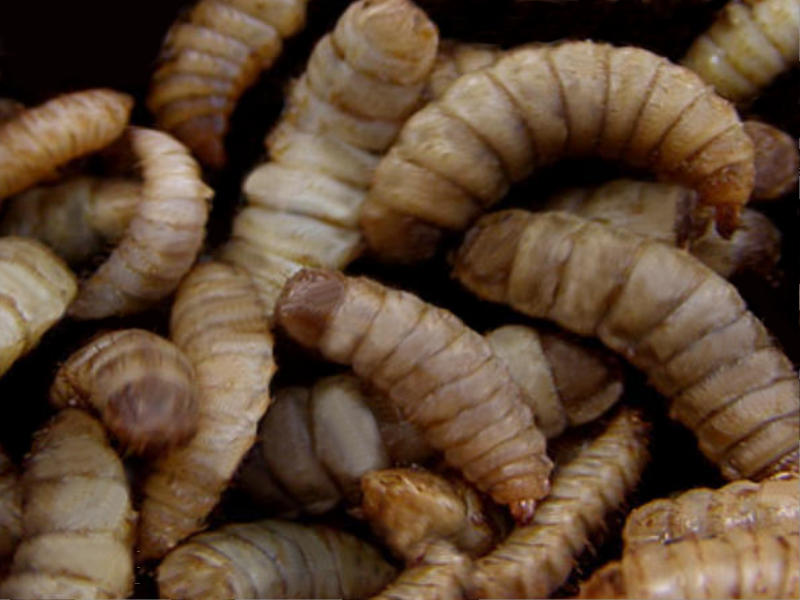
Black soldier fly larvae produced as animal feed

Insects as feed are insect species used as animal feed, either for livestock, including aquaculture, or as pet food.

As livestock feed production uses ~33% of the world's agricultural cropland use, insects might be able to supplement livestock feed. They can transform low-value organic wastes, are nutritious and have low environmental impacts. However, recent studies have shown that the carbon impact of insect proteins is higher than that of soybean meal or fish meal, reducing their environmental benefits.

== Utility ==
Due to their nutritional profile, especially the high protein content, various types of insects can be used as feed for industrial animal production and aquaculture. An insect-based diet for farm animals has been scientifically investigated for pigs, poultry and edible fish. Insects can provide as much protein and essential amino acids for swine and poultry that can potentially replace soybean meal in a diet. Inclusion of black soldier fly larvae in a diet for fish farming gave positive effect with no difference in odor and texture.

At the same time, there are challenges and disadvantages compared to established feed in terms of performance and growth. For monogastric farm animals, such as swine and poultry, replacing their conventional formula entirely with insects can result to decrease in performance and growth e.g., because insect flour may contain high levels of ash. However other research suggests that animals fed insect protein from black-soldier flies, achieved faster growth rates and better-quality meat than with soya or fishmeal.

With a view to protecting the environment and resources as well as feed and food security in the face of a growing world population, the UN Food and Agriculture Organization (FAO) has called for increased use of feed insects for feed production.

== Insect species with potential as feed ==
Black-soldier flies, common house fly larvae and mealworms are some of the most common insects in animal feed production. Black soldier flies and common house flies often reside in manure piles and in organic wastes. Farming these insects could promote better manure and organic waste management, while providing nutritious feed ingredient to pets and livestock.

Aside from nutritional composition and digestibility, insects are also selected for ease of rearing by the producer. A study compared insect species regarding their suitability as feed material, investigating their development time, survival rate, efficiency of converting base feed into insect biomass (FCR), dry matter conversion rate (ECI), and nitrogen efficiency (N-ECI). In the table, values indicate the mean ± one standard deviation, and superscripts indicate significant differences.

Sample Size	n	Diet	Survival rate	Development time (days)	FCR	ECI	N-ECI
Argentinian Cockroach	6	HPHF	80±17.9^{a}	200±28.8^{c}	1.7±0.24^{c}	21±3.0^{b}	58±8.3^{b}
Argentinian Cockroach	6	HPLF	47±16.3^{b}	294±33.5^{a}	2.3±0.35^{ab}	16±2.7^{bc}	51±8.7^{b}
Argentinian Cockroach	6	LPHF	53±13.2^{ab}	266±29.3^{ab}	1.5±0.19^{c}	30±3.9^{a}	87±11.4^{a}
Argentinian Cockroach	6	LPLF	51±12.2^{ab}	237±14.9^{bc}	1.7±0.15^{bc}	18±1.9^{bc}	66±6.7^{b}
Argentinian Cockroach	6	Control	75±21.7^{ab}	211±18.7^{c}	2.7±0.47^{a}	14±2.1^{c}	52±8.1^{b}
Black Soldier Fly	6	HPHF	86±18.0	21±1.4^{c}	1.4±0.12	24±1.5	51±3.2
Black Soldier Fly	6	HPLF	77±19.8	33±5.4^{ab}	1.9±0.20	20±1.3	51±32.5
Black Soldier Fly	6	LPHF	72±12.9	37±10.6^{a}	2.3±0.56	18±4.8	55±14.6
Black Soldier Fly	5	LPLF	74±23.5	37±5.8^{a}	2.6±0.85	17±5.0	43±12.8
Black Soldier Fly	6	Control	75±31.0	21±1.1^{bc}	1.8±0.71	23±5.3	52±12.2
Yellow Meal Worm	6	HPHF	79±7.0^{ab}	116±5.2^{def}	3.8±0.63^{c}	12±2.7^{cdef}	29±6.7^{cde}
Yellow Meal Worm	6	HPLF	67±12.3^{bc}	144±13.0^{cd}	4.1±0.25^{c}	10±1.0^{def}	22±2.3^{e}
Yellow Meal Worm	6	LPHF	19±7.3^{e}	191±21.9^{ab}	5.3±0.81^{c}	8±0.8^{ef}	28±2.8^{de}
Yellow Meal Worm	6	LPLF	52±9.2^{cd}	227±26.9^{a}	6.1±0.62^{c}	7±1.0^{f}	23±3.1^{de}
Yellow Meal Worm	6	Control 1	84±9.9^{ab}	145±9.3^{cd}	4.8±0.14^{c}	9±0.2^{def}	28±0.6^{cde}
Yellow Meal Worm	6	Control 2	34±15.0^{de}	151±7.8^{bcd}	4.1±0.49^{c}	11±1.5^{cdef}	31±4.2^{cde}
Yellow Meal Worm	6	HPHF-C	88±5.4^{ab}	88±5.1^{f}	4.5±0.17^{c}	19±1.6^{ab}	45±4.5^{b}
Yellow Meal Worm	6	HPLF-C	82±6.4^{ab}	83±6.5^{f}	5.8±0.48^{c}	15±0.9^{bc}	35±2.2^{bcd}
Yellow Meal Worm	6	LPHF-C	15±7.4^{e}	135±17.3^{cde}	19.1±5.93^{a}	13±2.7^{cde}	45±9.2^{ab}
Yellow Meal Worm	6	LPLF-C	80±5.6^{ab}	164±32.9^{bc}	10.9±0.61^{b}	13±1.4^{cde}	41±4.6^{bc}
Yellow Meal Worm	6	Control 1-C	93±9.3^{a}	91±8.5^{f}	5.5±0.49^{c}	14±3.3^{bcd}	45±2.4^{b}
Yellow Meal Worm	6	Control 2-C	88±3.1^{ab}	E95±8.0^{ef}	5.0±0.48^{c}	21±2.6^{a}	58±7.3^{a}
House cricket	6	HPHF	27±19.0^{ab}	55±7.3^{c}	4.5±2.84	8±4.9	23±13.4^{b}
House cricket	1	HPLF	6	117	10	3	-
House cricket	3	LPHF	7±3.1^{b}	167±4.4^{a}	6.1±1.75	5±1.3	-
House cricket	2	LPLF	11±1.4^{b}	121±2.8^{b}	3.2±0.69	9±2.2	-
House cricket	6	Control	55±11.2^{a}	48±2.3^{c}	2.3±0.57	12±3.2	41±10.8^{a}

HPHF = high protein, high fat; HPLF = high protein, low fat; LPHF = low protein, high fat; LPLF = low protein, low fat, C= carrot supplementation

== Insects as feed in aquaculture ==
In the European Union, the use of seven insect species as feed in aquaculture has been permitted since July 1, 2017:

- Black soldier fly (Hermetia illucens),
- Housefly (Musca domestica),
- Mealworm (Tenebrio molitor),
- Lesser mealworm (Alphitobius diaperinus),
- House cricket (Acheta domesticus),
- Tropical house cricket (Gryllodes sigillatus), as well as
- Field cricket (Gryllus assimilis).

The inclusion of black soldier flies in the feed of farmed fish had positive results and showed no differences in taste or texture of the fish.

== Environment and sustainability ==
As global populations rise, food demand is becoming an increasingly important issue. Raising conventional livestock requires resources such as land and water. As a result, the ability to meet the needs of the growing population may require alternative sources of quality protein.

Insects also have the ability to feed on organic waste products such as vegetable, restaurant and animal waste, therefore reducing the amount of excess food produced by humans. Insects are efficient at converting feed into protein.

== Challenges ==
According to two researchers, the "scaling up of production depends on whether cheap organic wastes can be safely used and easily biotransformed into high-quality insect products and whether legislative frameworks are conducive to this approach".

Further challenges include "automation of production techniques, optimization of bioconversion by an efficient interaction between microbes in the insect gut and feed substrate, disease management, making use of the short life cycle of insects to select efficient strains of insects and microbes for certain diets, food safety issues, and processing" as well as "safety of using waste to avoid any pathogen transmission".

== Regulation ==
The use of insects in feed in the European Union was previously prohibited under an act called "TSE Regulation" (Article 7 and Annex IV of Regulation 999/2001) that bans the use of animal protein in animal feed. In July 2017 this regulation was revised and partially lifts the ban on animal proteins, allowing insects to be included in fish feed.

This was coupled with another change that reclassified insects in the European Union (EU) catalogue of feed materials. This change specifically references to insect fats and insects proteins instead of classifying them under a broad title of animal products. Due to this change, producers now must list the species and life stage of the insect on their product.

In 2021, the EU authorized insect-derived processed animal proteins in poultry and pig feed.

== See also ==
- Insect based pet food
- Insect farming
