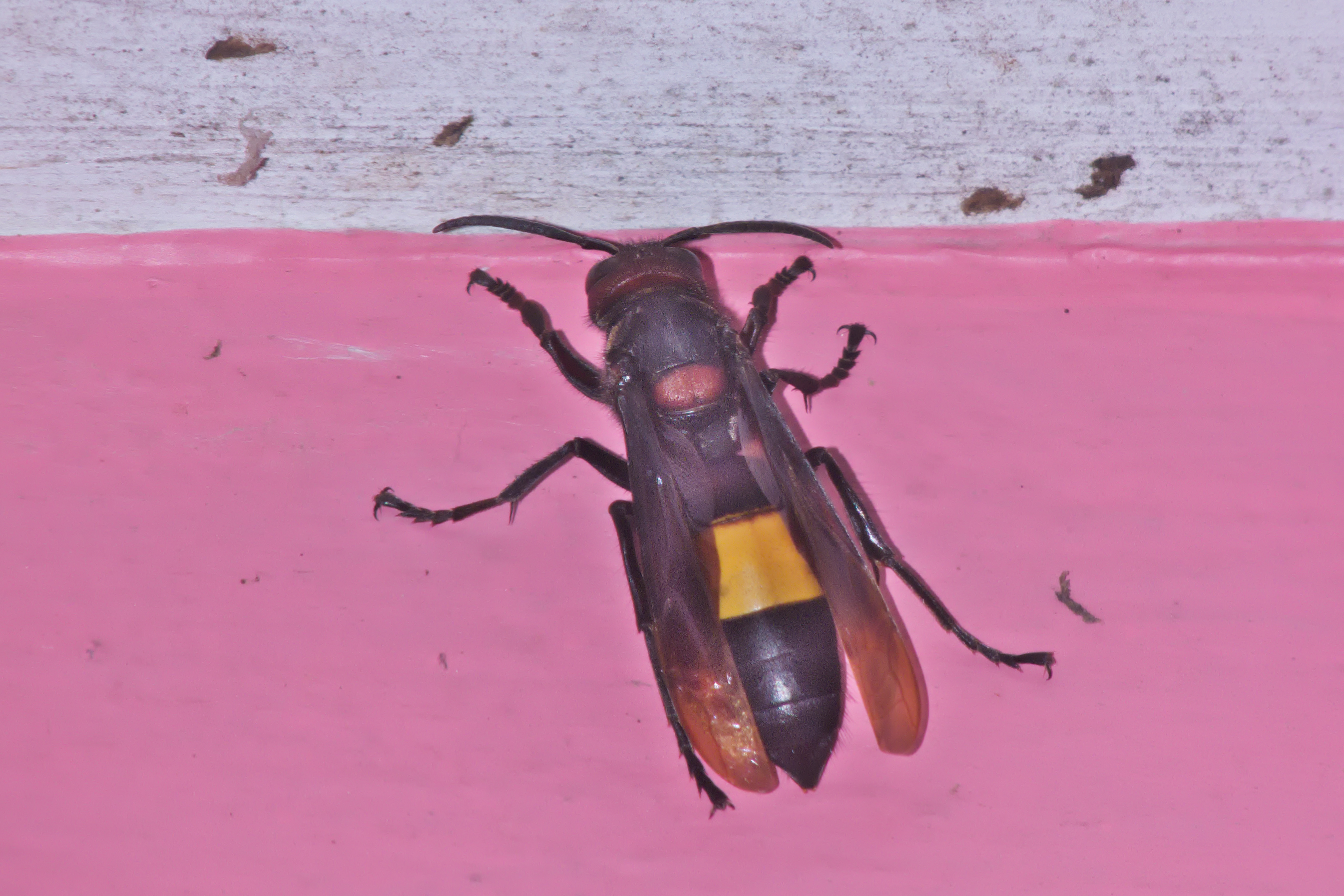
- Adult

Scientific classification
- Kingdom: Animalia
- Phylum: Arthropoda
- Clade: Pancrustacea
- Class: Insecta
- Order: Hymenoptera
- Family: Vespidae
- Genus: Vespa
- Species: V. tropica

Binomial name
- Vespa tropica (Linnaeus, 1758)

Synonyms
- Sphex tropica Linnaeus, 1758; Vespa cincta Fabricius, 1775; Vespa eulemoides du Buysson, 1905

= Vespa tropica =

Greater banded hornet

Species of hornet

Vespa tropica, the greater banded hornet, is a tropical species of hornet found in Southern Asia, New Guinea and west Africa, and which has recently been discovered to be an invasive species on the Pacific island of Guam. It is a predator of paper wasps and possesses a potent sting, which can cause extreme pain and swelling.

== Description ==
The workers of Vespa tropica are about 24–26 millimetres (15/16–1 in) in length, while queens grow to 30 millimetres (1 1/4 in). The head is dark brown/red; the abdomen is black with a distinct yellow stripe which covers most of the second abdominal segment. However, there is some variation across its range and in Singapore and southeastern Asia, specimens are often completely black and larger in size, while in other regions such as Hong Kong, the head and flanks of the thorax are normally reddish. A third colour form is found in the Andamans and Nicobars, which has a reddish brown head and thorax and all the dorsal plates on each segment of the gastrum are orange except the first.

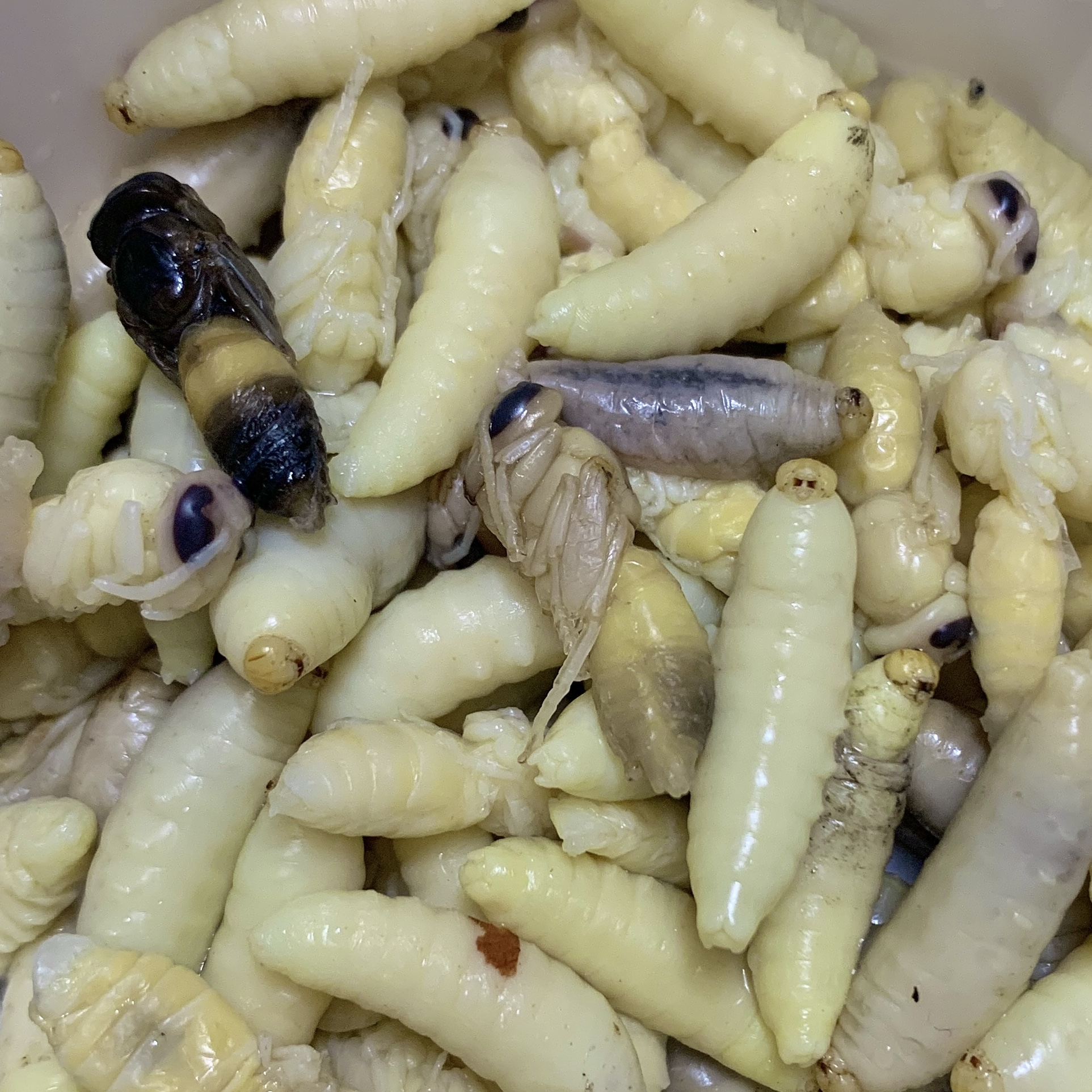
Larvae of greater banded hornet

== Distribution ==
Vespa tropica is distributed throughout southern Asia from Afghanistan to the Philippines, south to New Guinea, New Britain and the Torres Strait Islands but it has not been recorded in mainland Australia.

=== Invasive ===
In August 2016 Vespa tropica was found at two sites in Guam, and has since been deemed a permanent resident of the island's ecosystem, until a solution is found to exterminate them.

== Biology ==
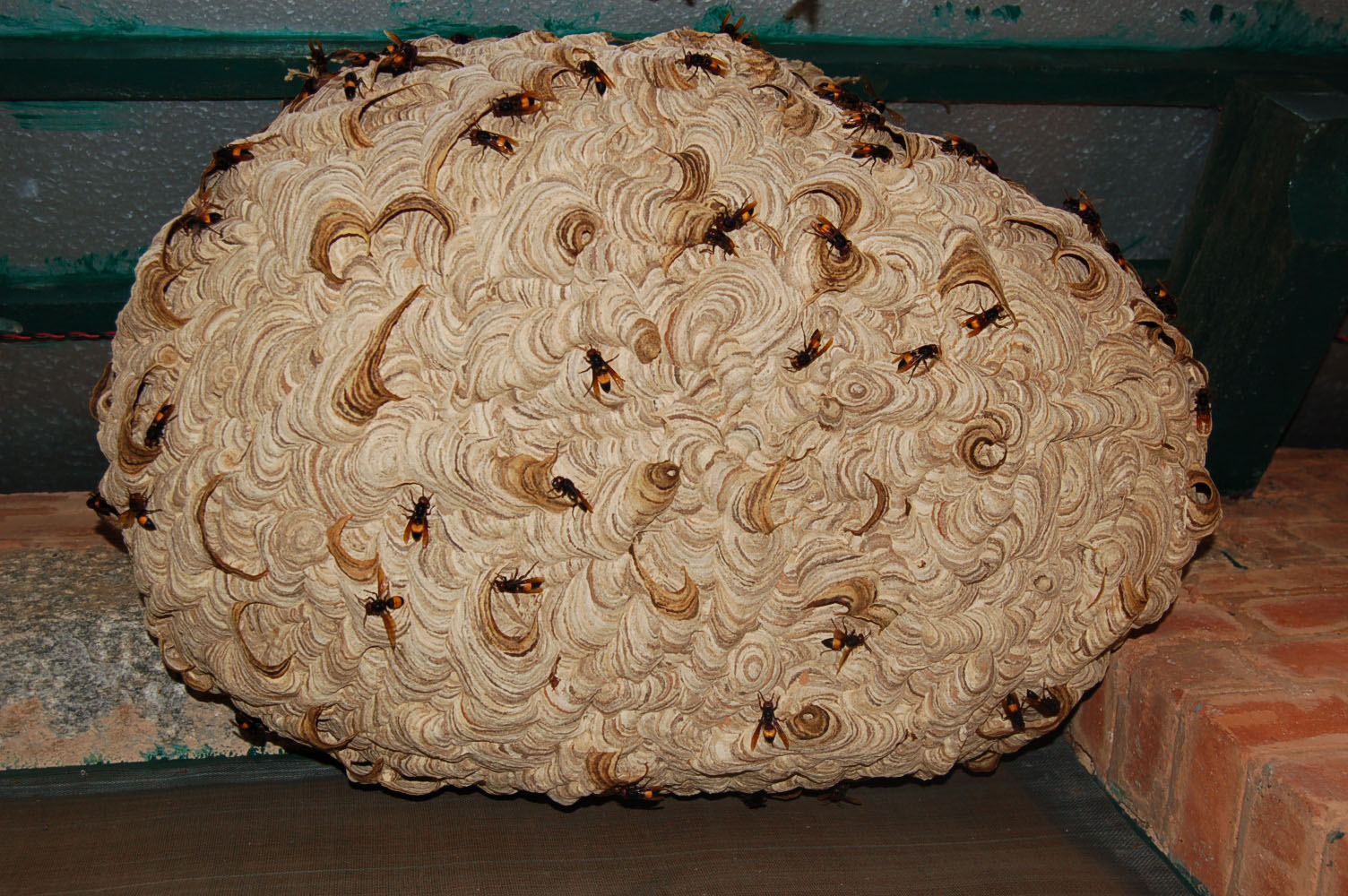
Active nest of Vespa tropica attached to a wall

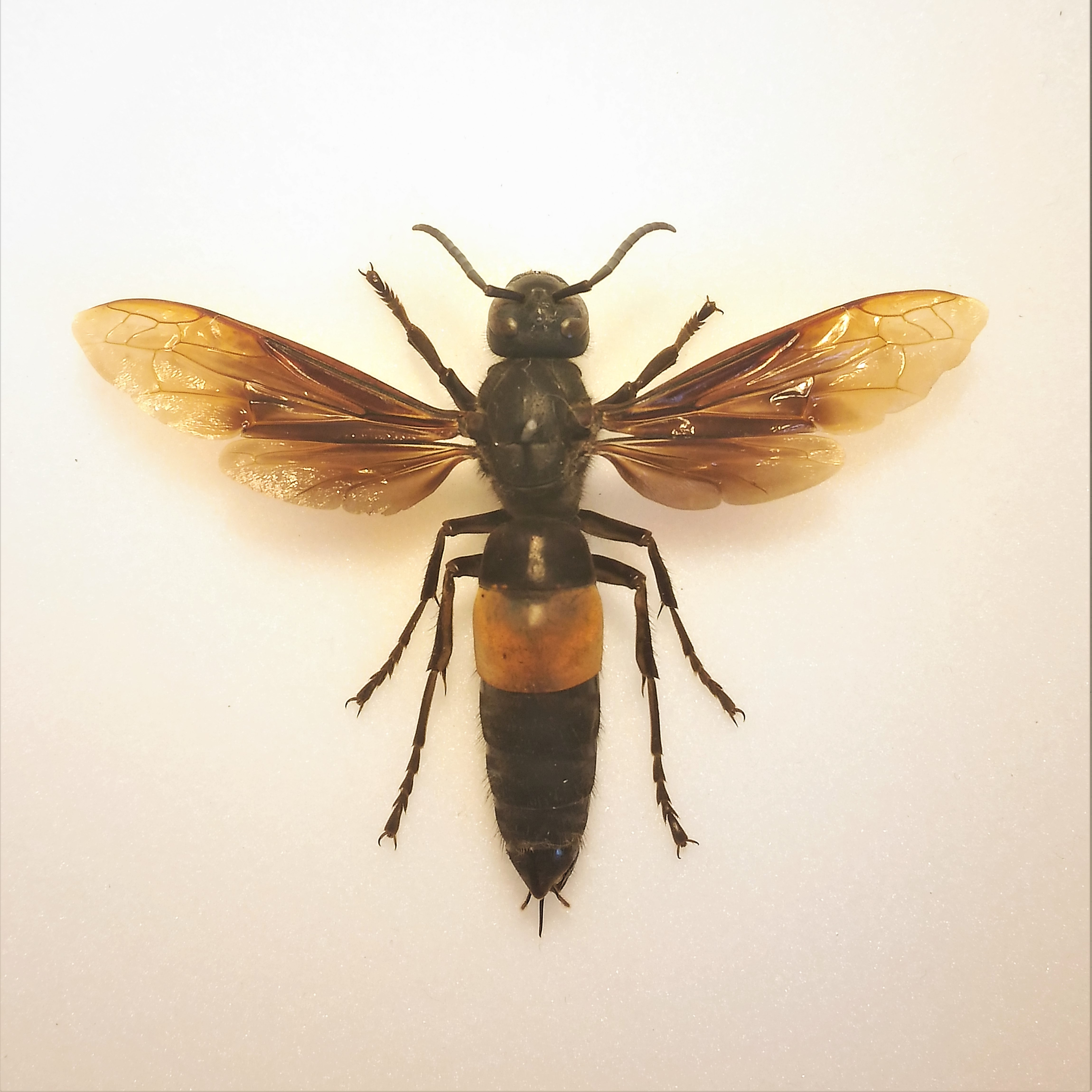
Vespa tropica – collection of Filippo Turetta

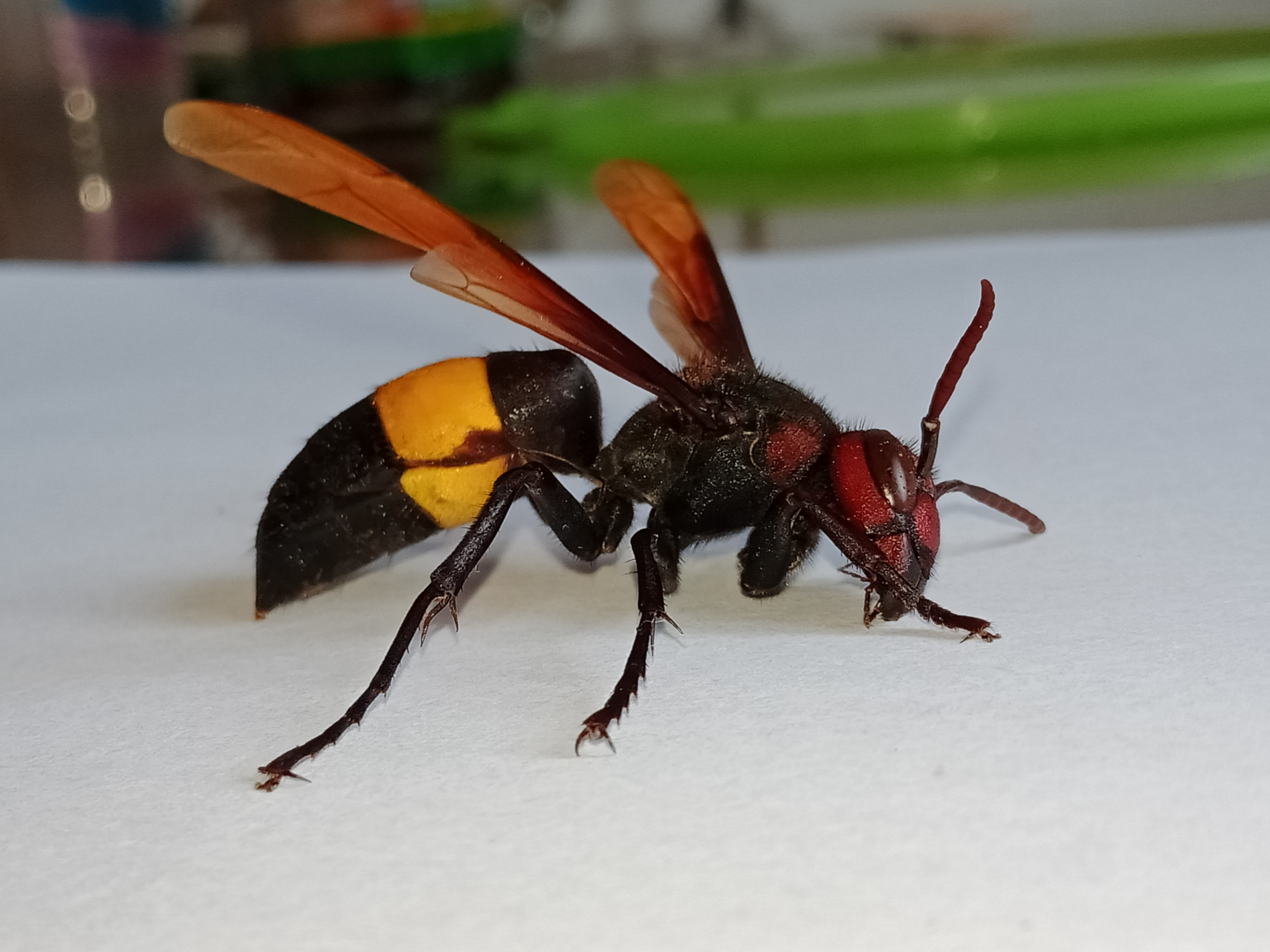
Vespa tropica worker

Vespa tropica are raiders of the nests of other wasp species and take captured larvae back to their own nest to feed to their larvae. They have been observed to catch honeybees quite frequently, and even dragonflies have been noted as prey. A worker of V. tropica has been recorded as capturing and killing an individual of Vespa bicolor and also raiding nests of other polister wasps such as Ropalidia marginata. Vespa tropica is associated with forests in the lowlands, up to 2,100 metres (6,890 ft) altitude. The nests are usually within 3 metres (3 yd) above the ground in tree hollows or in subterranean cavities normally down to a depth of 20 centimetres (8 in) including a record of one found inside a dead log partly buried in the soil. In the vicinity of human habitations it will nest under roofs, in attics and sheds. The nest is normally rhomboid or bowl-shaped and has an open bottom, whereas most aerial hornets' nest are completely sealed. The outer shell of the nest consists of distinct, broad layers and the nest is quite brittle. Occasionally nests are built within the crown of trees. Nest temperature is maintained at 25–30 °C (77–86 °F) until about the middle of October, when it trends towards ambient (Note: p. 306, "V. tropica This species controls its nest temperature effectively despite its small colony size (Fig. 5). V. tropica colonies in the study area are less than one-tenth the sue of V. simillima colonies. Although the nest temperature is lower than that in V. simillima it is still well above ambient; it is stable and reaches a maximum around the time the sexuals are being produced.") as the nest begins to die. Predation by V. tropica is one of the foremost causes of colony failure in Polistes chinensis in Japan. V. tropica may play a significant role in controlling Asian polistine populations. It can be a secretive species, preferring to fly close to cover and often high among the crowns of trees. V. tropica, V. ducalis, and V. philippinensis together form the sub-genus V. tropica group. (Note: p. 228, "V. tropica, V. ducalis and V. philippinensis can be separated from all other species of Vespa by the following combination of characters of which 1, 3 and 4 are considered derived and 2 and 5 primitive (Archer, unpublished).: 1. First gastral tergum long, as seen from above, about half as long or longer than wide (fig. 1A).; 2. Pretegula carina complete (fig. 1 B).; 3. Lateral apical margin of the clypeus produced as a blunt triangular projection, greater than a semicircle (fig. 1 C).; In addition the following male characters should also be used.; 4. Apical margin of the seventh gastral sternum slightly concave (fig. 1 D).; 5. Apical margin of the sixth gastral sternum with one shallow emargination, less than a semicircle (fig. 1 D)")
