= An Egyptian Hornet =

"An Egyptian Hornet" is a short story written by Algernon Blackwood. The story has first appeared in 1915 in Reedy's Mirror.

== Short summary ==
Rev. James Milligan goes for his morning bath. On his way to the bath he encounters an Egyptian Hornet in the hallway leading to the bathroom of the hotel he is staying in. At first the hornet frightens him. Then in his mind he describes the hornet in which, to his own disgust, he uses a more feminine erotic terminology. As he hesitates to enter the bathroom, another guest in the hotel Mr. Mullins, is getting impatient. As Rev. Milligan does not want to lose his bathing time he passes the hornet into the bathroom. After bathing he again hesitates when passing the hornet. As he hears Mr. Mullins come to the bathroom again he gets the idea of letting Mr. Mullins deal with the hornet. As Rev. Milligan goes to his room he listens in on what Mullins does, Mr. Mullins knocks the hornet to the floor and throws it out of the window. This shaming Rev. Milligan, as he the pious reverend should have at least warned Mr. Mullins, but rather he has wished the hornet the sting Mr. Mullins.

== Themes ==
The reverend is described as an honest pious man, yet he constantly has bad sinful thoughts. And he leaves the problem to be solved by Mr. Mullins, whom he despises. In doing this the author writes that: 'All men, except those very big ones who are supermen, have something astonishingly despicable in them.' Then the reverend even wished for the hornet to sting Mr. Mullins. Hereby the author clearly shows that all men can do wrong, even the most pious and well respected men. For this the only requirement is that the situation allows them to. This whole scene also shows that despite the fact that Mr. Mullins is a drunkard he is superior to the reverend. As the latter shamefully acknowledges this in his thought.
