= V. orientalis =

V. orientalis may refer to:

- Vespa orientalis, the Oriental hornet, an insect species
- Vidua orientalis, the Sahel paradise whydah or Northern paradise whydah, a small songbird species found in west Africa
- Vibrio orientalis, a Gram-negative bacterium species in the genus Vibrio

== See also ==
- Orientalis (disambiguation)
