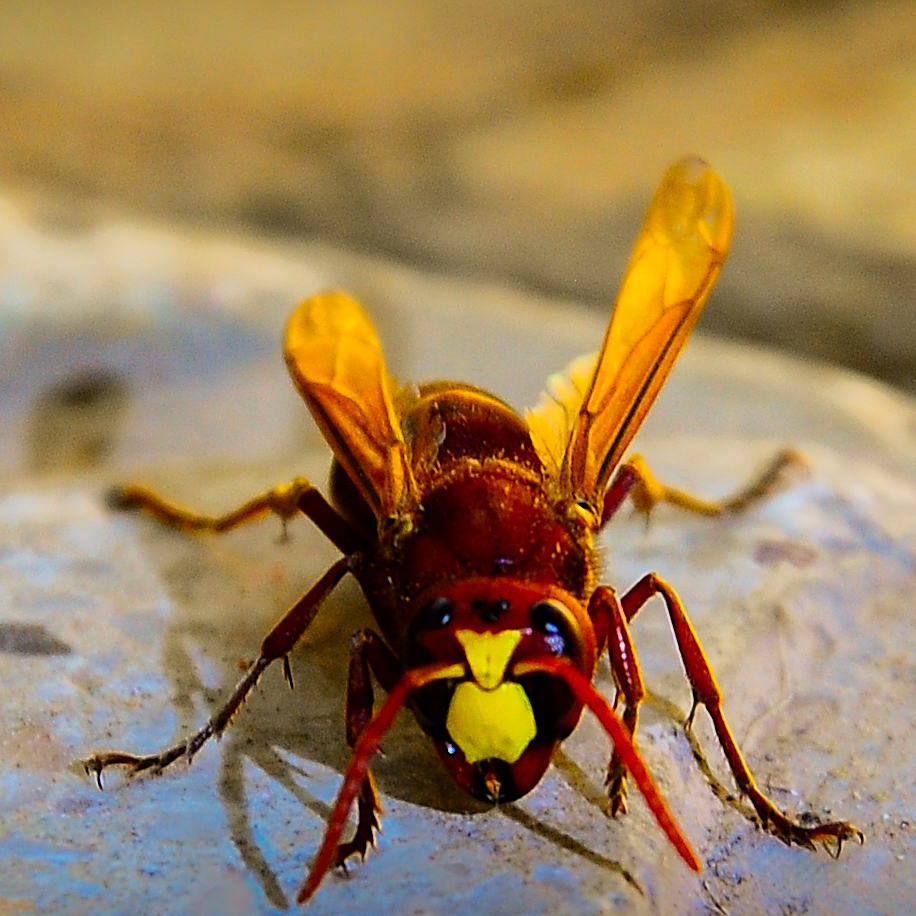
- Oriental hornet (Vespa orientalis)

Scientific classification
- Kingdom: Animalia
- Phylum: Arthropoda
- Clade: Pancrustacea
- Class: Insecta
- Order: Hymenoptera
- Family: Vespidae
- Subfamily: Vespinae
- Genus: Vespa; Linnaeus, 1758

Type species
- Vespa crabro Linnaeus, 1758

Species
- See text

= Hornet =

Genus of eusocial wasp

Hornets are wasps of the genus Vespa in the subfamily Vespinae (the vespine wasps). They are the largest of the eusocial wasps. Species like the European hornet can grow to 35 mm (1.4 in) in length, while other species like the Asian giant hornet (Vespa mandarinia) can exceed 50 mm (2.0 in). They are similar in appearance to their close relatives, the yellowjackets, but are distinguished from other vespine wasps by the relatively large top margin of the head, or vertex. Worldwide, 22 species of Vespa are recognized. Most species only occur in the tropics of Asia, though the European hornet (V. crabro) is widely distributed throughout Europe, Russia, North America, and north-eastern Asia. Wasps of the genus Dolichovespula native to North America are commonly called hornets (e.g., bald-faced hornet), but are actually yellowjackets.

Like other social wasps, hornets build communal nests by chewing wood to make a papery pulp. Each nest has one queen, which lays eggs and is attended by workers that, while genetically female, cannot lay fertile eggs. Most species make exposed nests in trees and shrubs, but some (such as Vespa orientalis) build their nests underground or in other cavities. In the tropics, these nests may last year-round, but in temperate areas, the nest dies over the winter, with lone queens hibernating in leaf litter or other insulative material until the spring. Male hornets are docile and do not have stingers.

Hornets are often considered pests because they aggressively guard their nesting sites when threatened and their stings can be more dangerous than those of bees.

== Classification ==
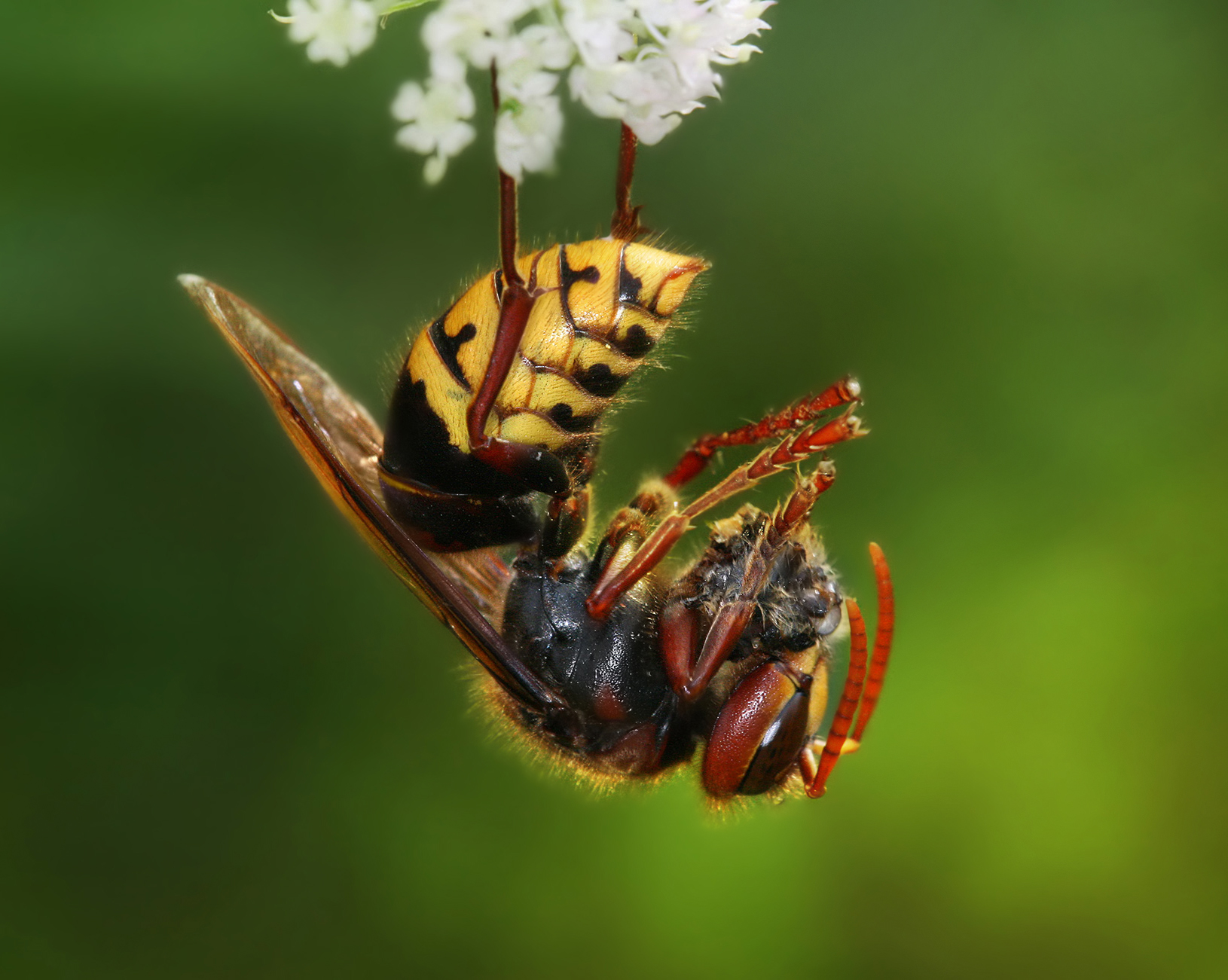
European hornet with the remnants of a honey bee

While taxonomically well defined, some confusion may remain about the differences between hornets and other wasps of the family Vespidae, specifically the yellowjackets, which are members of the same subfamily. Also, a related genus of Asian nocturnal vespines, Provespa, is referred to as "night wasps" or "night hornets", though they are not true hornets.

Some other large wasps are sometimes referred to as hornets, most notably the bald-faced hornet (Dolichovespula maculata) found in North America. It is set apart by its black and ivory coloration. The name "hornet" is used for this species primarily because of its habit of making aerial nests (similar to some of the true hornets) rather than subterranean nests. Another example is the Australian hornet (Abispa ephippium), which is actually a species of potter wasp.

== Distribution ==
Hornets are found mainly in the Northern Hemisphere. The European hornet (V. crabro) is the best-known species, widely distributed in Europe (but is never found north of the 63rd parallel), and European Russia (except in extreme northern areas). In the east, the species' distribution area stretches over the Ural Mountains to western Siberia (found in the vicinity of Khanty-Mansiysk). In Asia, the European hornet is found in southern Siberia, as well as in eastern China. The European hornet was accidentally introduced to eastern North America about the middle of the 19th century and has lived there since at about the same latitudes as in Europe. However, it has never been found in western North America.

The Asian giant hornet (V. mandarinia) lives in the Primorsky Krai, Khabarovsky Krai (southern part), and Jewish Autonomous Oblast regions of Russia, and China, Korea, Taiwan, Cambodia, Laos, Vietnam, Indochina, India, Nepal, Sri Lanka, and Thailand, but is most commonly found in the mountains of Japan, where they are commonly known as the giant sparrow bee.

The Oriental hornet (V. orientalis) occurs in semidry, subtropical areas of central Asia (Azerbaijan, Armenia, Dagestan in Russia, Iran, Afghanistan, Oman, Pakistan, Bangladesh, Turkmenistan, Uzbekistan, Tajikistan, Kyrghyzstan, southern Kazakhstan), and southern Europe (Italy, Malta, Albania, Romania, Turkey, Greece, Bulgaria, Cyprus).

The Asian hornet (V. velutina) has been introduced to Belgium, Germany, France, Spain, Portugal, Italy, and the United Kingdom.

== Stings ==
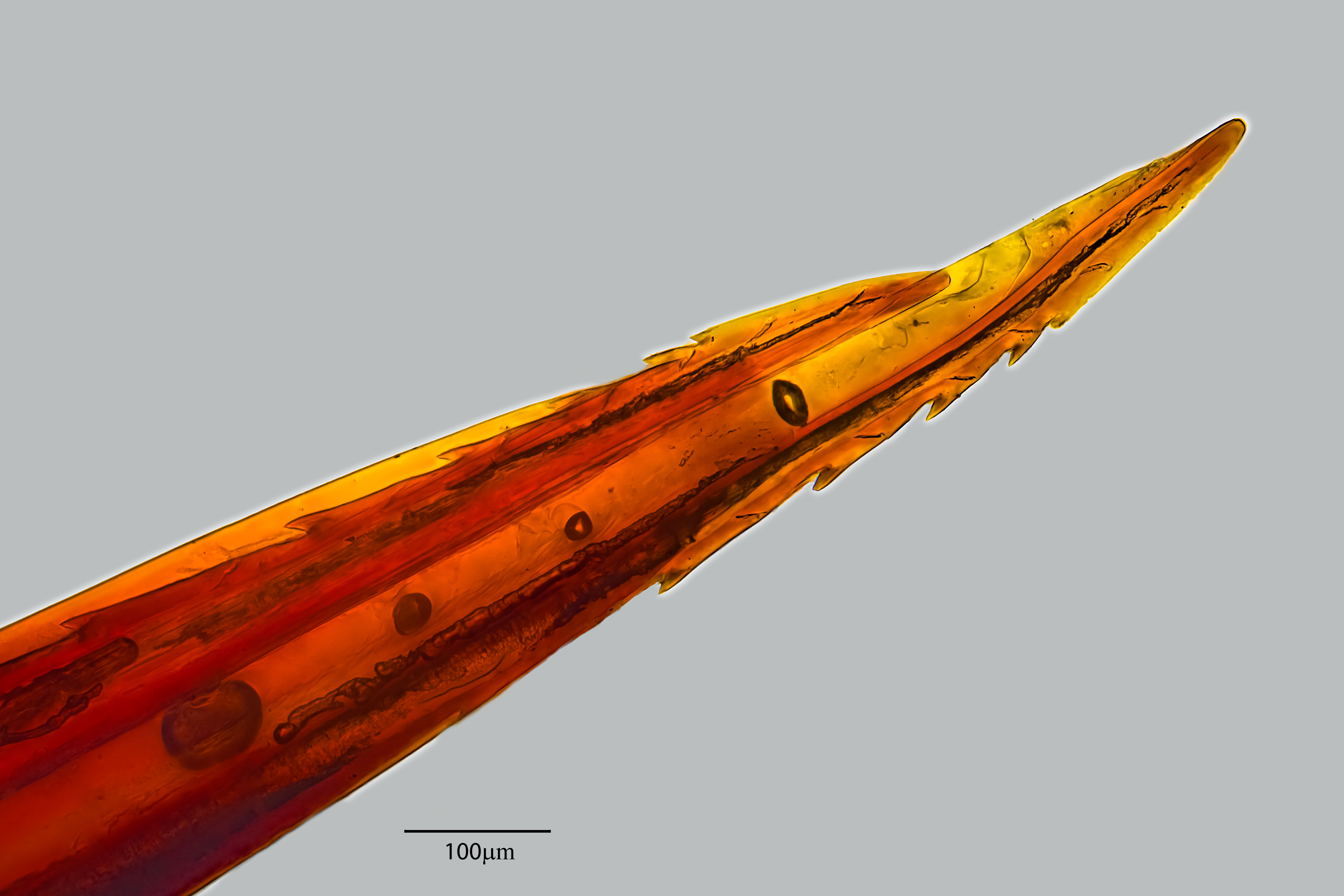
A European hornet stinger under an optical microscope

Hornets have stingers, which are used to kill prey and defend nests. Hornet stings are more painful to humans than typical wasp stings because hornet venom contains a large amount (5%) of acetylcholine. Individual hornets can sting repeatedly. Unlike honey bees, hornets do not die after stinging because their stingers are very finely barbed and can easily be withdrawn, so are not pulled out of their bodies when disengaging.

The toxicity of hornet stings varies according to hornet species; some deliver just a typical insect sting, while others are among the most venomous known insects. Single hornet stings are not in themselves fatal, except sometimes to allergic victims. Multiple stings by hornets (other than V. crabro) may be fatal because of highly toxic species-specific components of their venom.

The stings of the Asian giant hornet (V. mandarinia) are among the most venomous known, and are thought to cause 30–50 human deaths annually in Japan. Between July and September 2013, hornet stings caused the death of 42 people in China. Asian giant hornet's venom can cause allergic reactions and multiple organ failures leading to death, though dialysis can be used to remove the toxins from the bloodstream. As with other wasps, death due to a single sting on the skin only occurs when an allergy is present, and serious outcomes with Asian giant hornet stings in China and Japan are only documented with many stings or anaphylactic shock due to an existing allergy.

People who are allergic to wasp venom may also be allergic to hornet stings. Allergic reactions are commonly treated with epinephrine (adrenaline) injection using a device such as an epinephrine autoinjector (EpiPen), with prompt follow-up treatment in a hospital. In severe cases, allergic individuals may go into anaphylactic shock and die unless treated promptly. In general, Vespa stings induce the release of histamine due to the various mastoparans that they contain. However, V. orientalis mastoparan is the interesting exception because it does not induce histamine increase in victim tissue – because it does not cause mast cell degranulation – and is not immunogenic.

== Attack pheromone ==
Hornets, like many social wasps, can mobilize the entire nest to sting in defense, which is highly dangerous to humans and other animals. The attack pheromone is released in case of threat to the nest. In the case of the Asian giant hornet (V. mandarinia), this is also used to mobilize many workers at once when attacking colonies of their prey, honey bees and other Vespa species. Three biologically active chemicals, 2-pentanol, isoamyl alcohol, and 1-methylbutyl 3-methylbutanoate, have been identified for this species. In field tests, 2-pentanol alone triggered mild alarm and defensive behavior, but adding the other two compounds increased aggressiveness in a synergistic effect. In the European hornet (V. crabro), the major compound of the alarm pheromone is 2-methyl-3-butene-2-ol.

If a hornet is killed near a nest, it may release pheromones that can cause the other hornets to attack. Materials that come into contact with these pheromones, such as clothes, skin, and dead prey or hornets, can also trigger an attack, as can certain food flavorings, such as banana and apple flavorings, and fragrances that contain C_{5} alcohols and C_{10} esters.

== Life cycle ==
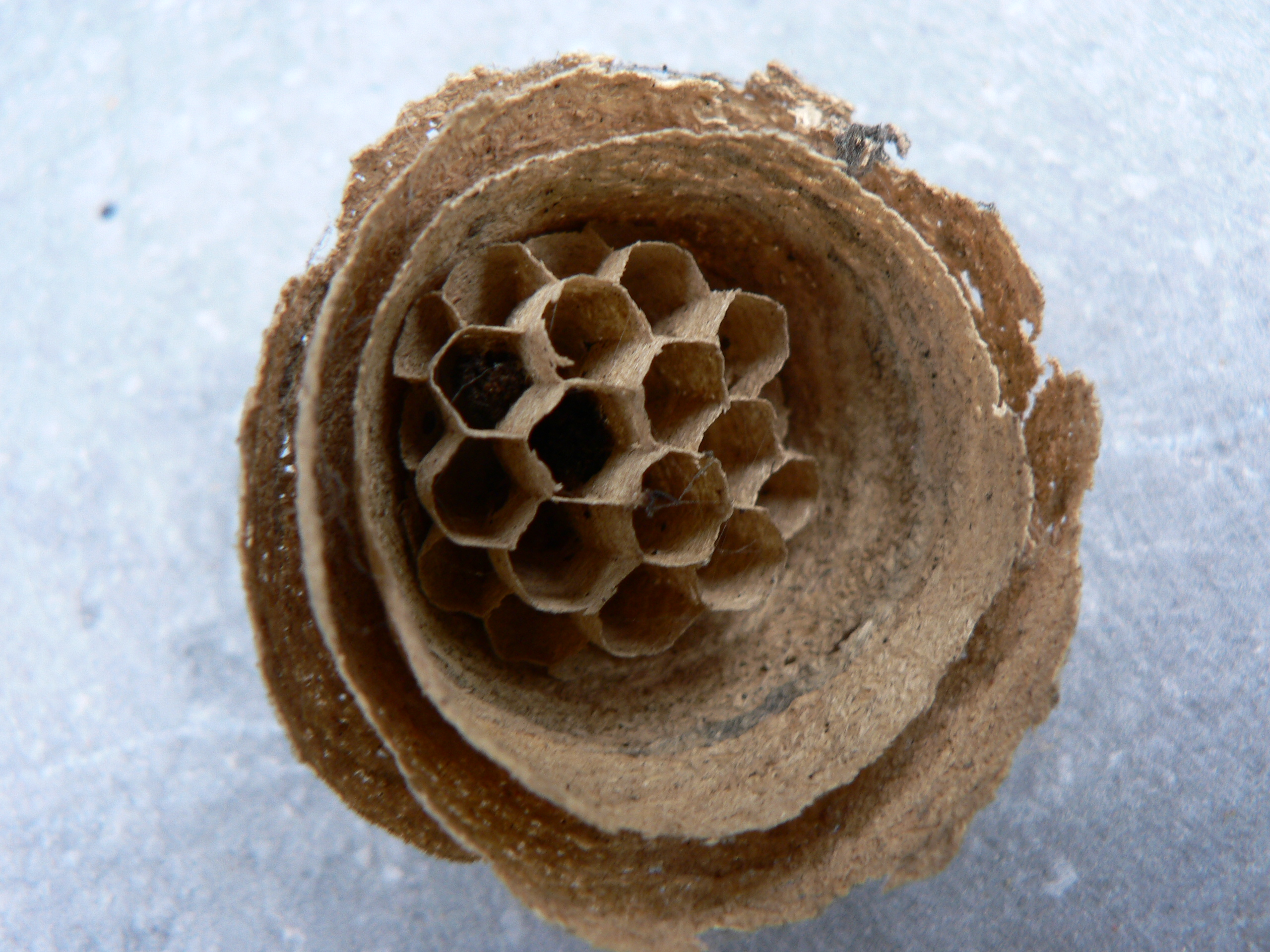
The structure of an incipient nest

In V. crabro, the nest is founded in spring by a fertilized female known as the queen. She generally selects sheltered places such as dark, hollow tree trunks. She first builds a series of cells (up to 50) out of chewed tree bark. The cells are arranged in horizontal layers named combs, each cell being vertical and closed at the top. An egg is then laid in each cell. After 5–8 days, the egg hatches. Over the following two weeks, the larva progresses through five stages of development. During this time, the queen feeds it a protein-rich diet of insects. Then, the larva spins a silk cap over the cell's opening, and during the next two weeks, transforms into an adult, a process called metamorphosis. The adult then eats its way through the silk cap. This first generation of workers, invariably females, now gradually undertakes all the tasks formerly carried out by the queen (foraging, nest building, taking care of the brood, etc.) with the exception of egg-laying, which remains exclusive to the queen.

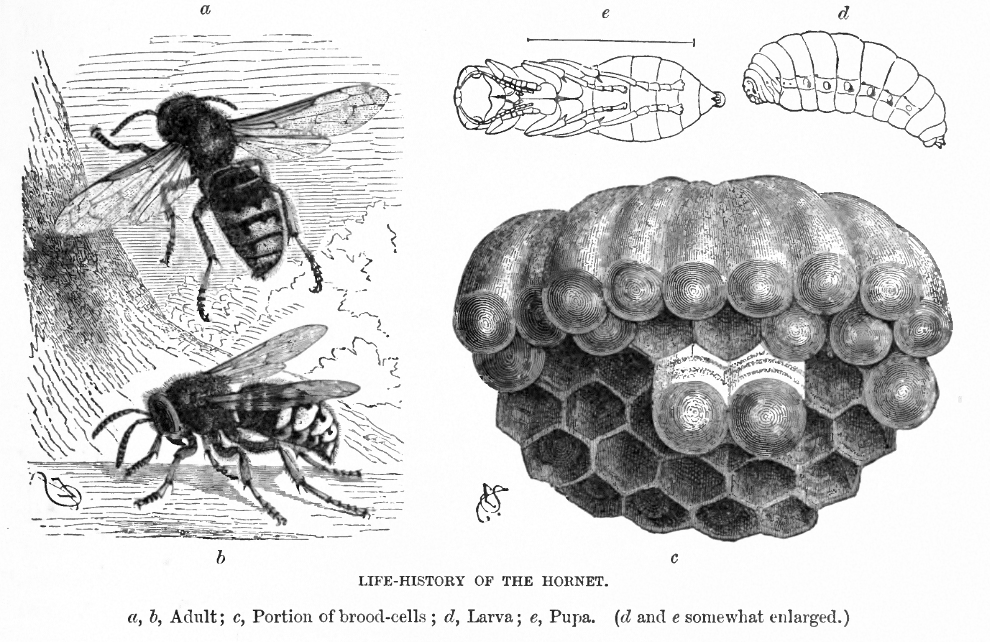
Life history of Vespa crabro

As the colony size grows, new combs are added, and an envelope is built around the cell layers until the nest is entirely covered, with the exception of an entry hole. To build cells in total darkness, they apparently use gravity to aid them. At the peak of its population, which occurs in late summer, the colony can reach a size of 700 workers.

In suburban and residential areas, hornets often construct nests under roof overhangs, in wall voids, or inside sheds and garages. These locations provide shelter from the elements and close proximity to human activity, which may increase the likelihood of encounters and stings.

At this time, the queen starts producing the first reproductive individuals. Fertilized eggs develop into females (called "gynes" by entomologists), and unfertilized ones develop into males (sometimes called "drones" as with honeybee drones). Adult males do not participate in nest maintenance, foraging, or caretaking of the larvae. In early to mid-autumn, they leave the nest and mate during "nuptial flights".

Other temperate species (e.g., the yellow hornet, V. simillima, or the Oriental hornet, V. orientalis) have similar cycles. In the case of tropical species (e.g., V. tropica), life histories may well differ, and in species with both tropical and temperate distributions (such as the Asian giant hornet, V. mandarinia), the cycle likely depends on latitude.

== Diet and feeding ==
Adult hornets and their relatives (e.g., yellowjackets) feed themselves with nectar and sugar-rich plant foods. Thus, they can often be found feeding on the sap of oak trees, rotting sweet fruits, honey, and any sugar-containing foodstuffs. Hornets frequently fly into orchards to feed on overripe fruit, and tend to gnaw a hole in fruit to become totally immersed in its pulp. A person who accidentally picks fruit with a feeding hornet can be attacked by the disturbed insect.

The adults also attack various insects, which they kill with stings and jaws. Due to their size and the power of their venom, hornets can kill large insects such as honey bees, grasshoppers, locusts, and katydids without difficulty. The victim is fully masticated and then fed to the larvae developing in the nest, rather than consumed by the adult hornets. Some of their prey being considered pests, hornets may be considered beneficial under some circumstances.

The larvae of hornets produce a sweet secretion containing sugars and amino acids that workers and queens consume.

== Predatory strategies ==
Hornets' ability to prey upon honey bees is favored by a number of adaptations. Vespa have a larger body size compared to their prey, a heavy exoskeleton to resist bee attacks, and strong mandibles and venomous sting. As concerns hornet hunting strategies, it has been demonstrated that some species such as V. tropica and V. velutina, can use both visual and olfactory cues for the long-range detection of honey bee colonies. Foragers of V. tropica can readily associate color and shape with potential food sources and exhibit color generalization. V. velutina foragers visually distinguish between bee dummy bait and cotton ball dummy bait, both treated with bee odors, preferring bee dummies.

Foraging hornets are also selectively attracted to honey bee colony odors, in particular honey and pollen, as well as honey bee pheromones, which may signal a high prey density. In laboratory assays, workers of V. velutina oriented especially towards geraniol, a component of the honey bee worker aggregation pheromone, that could therefore represent an honest signal for hornets. Behavioral, chemical and electrophysiological analyses have also demonstrated that Vespa bicolor is attracted to (Z)-11-eicosen-1-ol, which is major compound in the alarm pheromones of both Asian (Apis cerana) and European (Apis mellifera) honey bees, and its antennae respond to this compound.

The hornet attraction to honey bee pheromone is exploited by the orchid Dendrobium christyanum, which mimics the honey bee alarm pheromone in its flowers' scent to attract hornets that visit and pollinate the flowers. Bee-hunting hornets visit the non-rewarding flowers in search of prey.

== Species ==
While a history of recognizing subspecies exists within many of the Vespa species, the most recent taxonomic revision of the genus treats all subspecific names in the genus Vespa as synonyms, effectively relegating them to no more than informal names for regional color forms.

- Vespa affinis
- Vespa analis
- Vespa basalis
- Vespa bellicosa
- Vespa bicolor
- Vespa binghami
- Vespa crabro
- Vespa ducalis
- Vespa dybowskii
- Vespa fervida
- Vespa fumida
- Vespa luctuosa
- Vespa mandarinia
- Vespa mocsaryana
- Vespa multimaculata
- Vespa orientalis
- Vespa philippinensis
- Vespa simillima
- Vespa soror
- Vespa tropica
- Vespa velutina
- Vespa vivax

== As food and medicine ==
Hornet larvae are widely accepted as food in mountainous regions in China. Hornets and their nests are treated as medicine in traditional Chinese medicine.

== Gallery ==
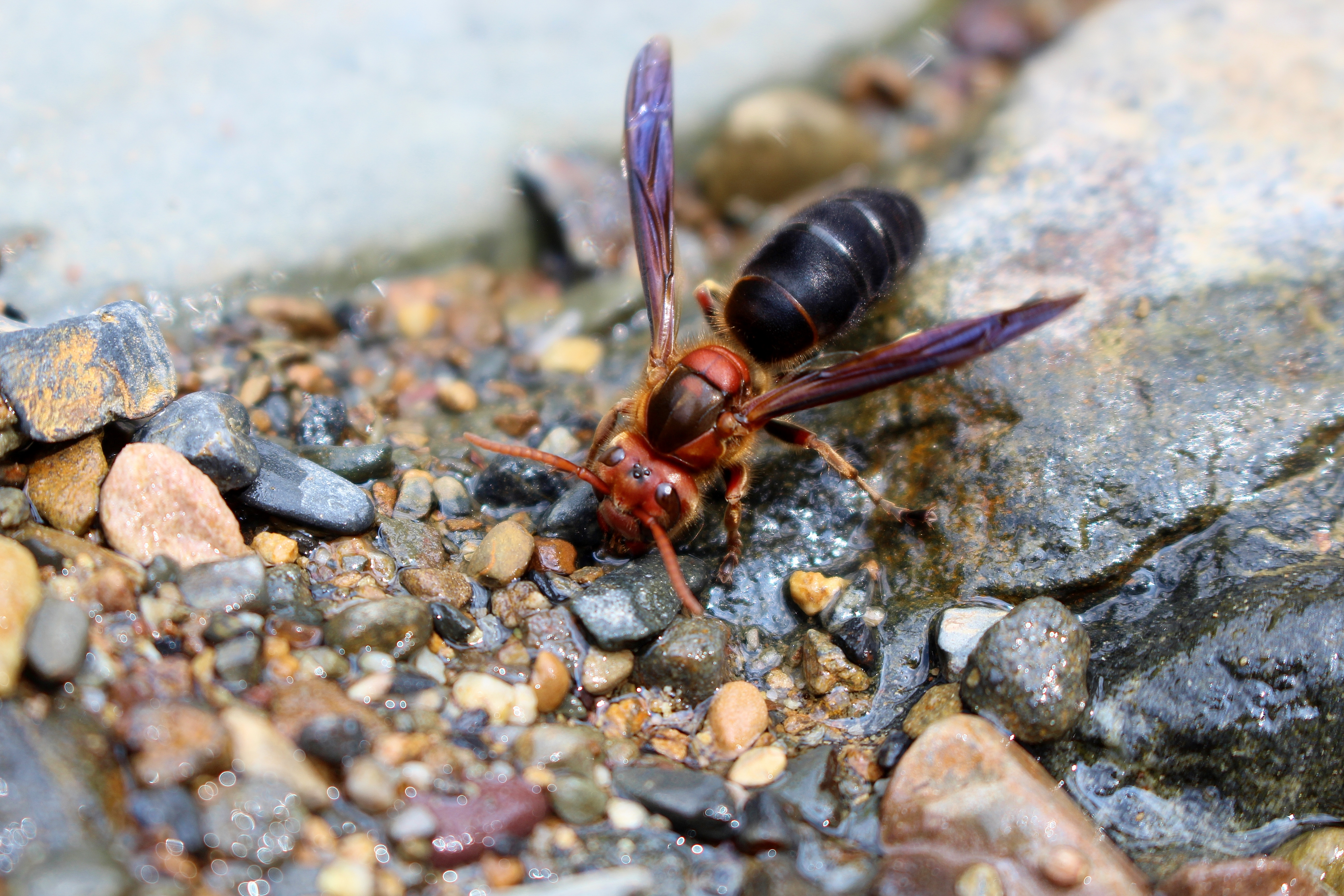
Black-bellied hornet (Vespa basalis), Xingping

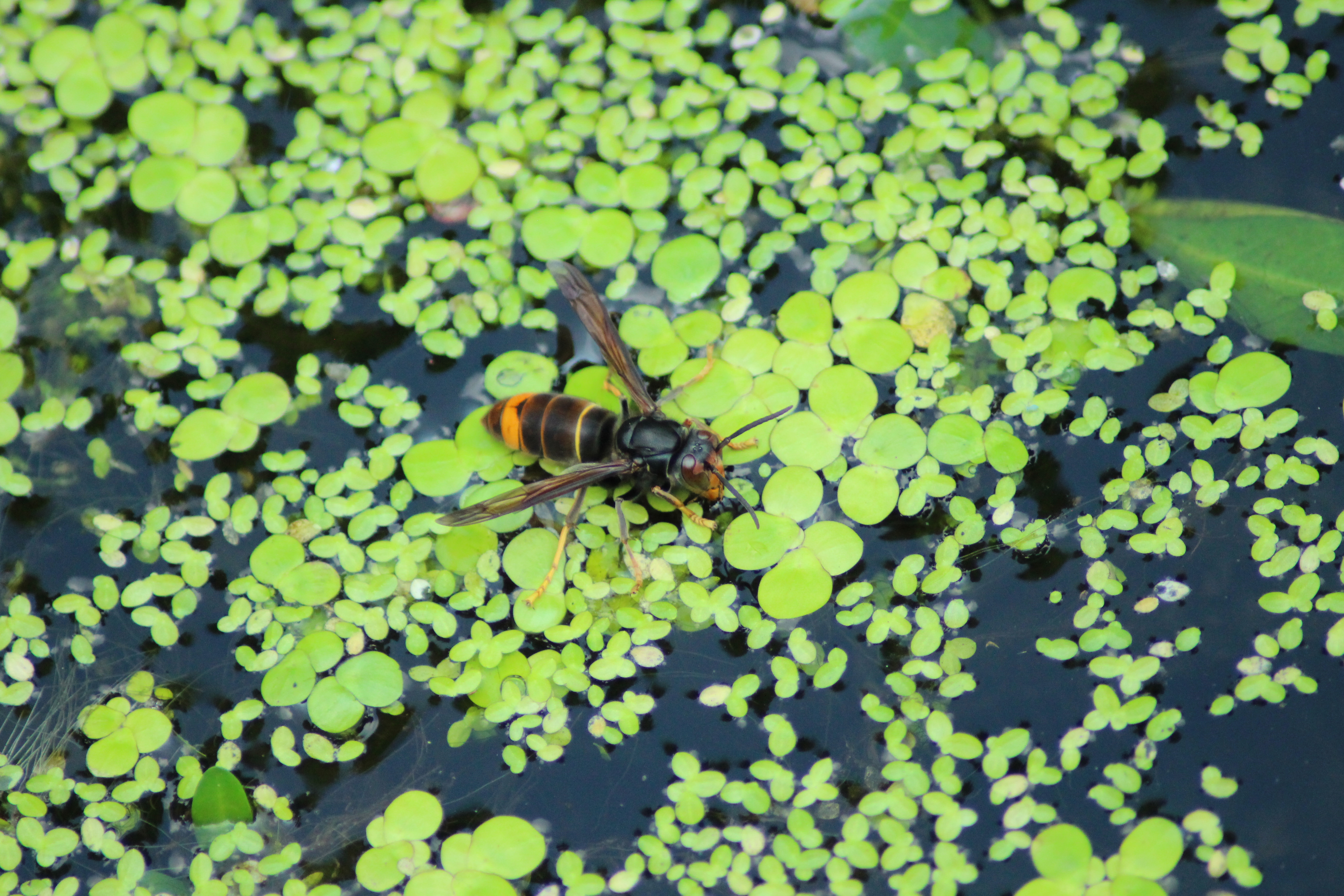
Asian hornet (Vespa velutina), Shanghai

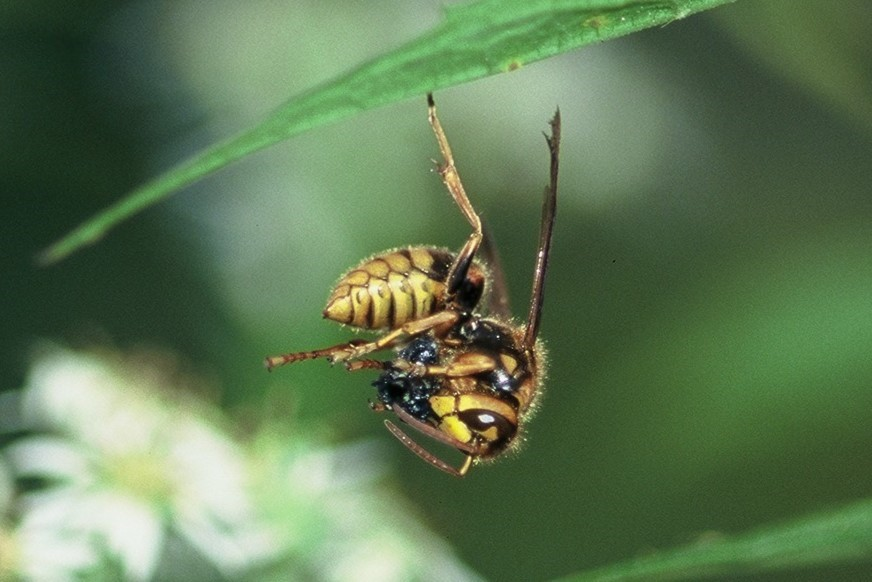
Japanese yellow hornet (Vespa simillima xanthoptera), Japan
