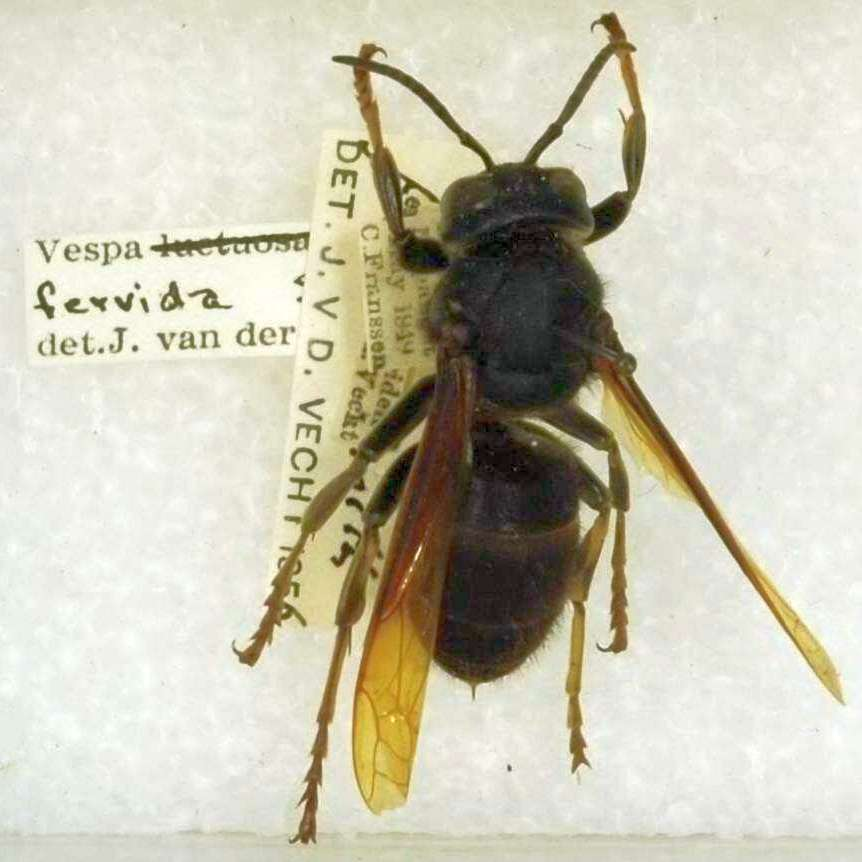

Scientific classification
- Kingdom: Animalia
- Phylum: Arthropoda
- Clade: Pancrustacea
- Class: Insecta
- Order: Hymenoptera
- Family: Vespidae
- Subfamily: Vespinae
- Genus: Vespa
- Species: V. fervida

Binomial name
- Vespa fervida Smith

= Vespa fervida =

Species of hornet

Vespa fervida is a rare species of hornet endemic to parts of Indonesia, primarily on the island of Sulawesi. Its range is quite small, with scattered populations and nesting colonies found on very rare occasions. The species nests have been previously recorded on large plant leaves and under fences near human developments. A similar species of hornet is Vespa luctuosa, which shares multiple related traits as seen in Vespa fervida. The species name derived from the Latin word “fervida”, which translates to “hot”, so the name hot hornet may apply, but has not been officially approved. It was described by Frederick Smith in 1859, who specialized in the family Hymenoptera.
