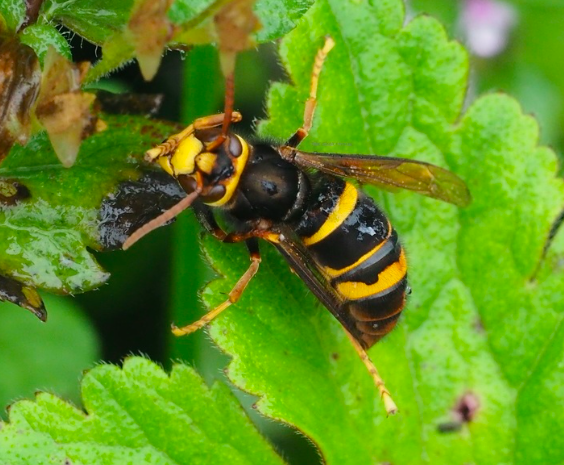

Scientific classification
- Kingdom: Animalia
- Phylum: Arthropoda
- Clade: Pancrustacea
- Class: Insecta
- Order: Hymenoptera
- Family: Vespidae
- Genus: Vespa
- Species: V. vivax

Binomial name
- Vespa vivax Smith, 1870

= Vespa vivax =

Species of wasp

Vespa vivax is a species of hornet that was described by Smith in 1870. Vespa vivax belongs to the genus group, Vespa, and to the family, Vespidae. It can be found across several countries in Asia, including India, Nepal, Myanmar, Thailand, China (Sichuan, Yunnan, Tibet) and Taiwan.
