= Vespa bellicosa =

Scientific classification
- Kingdom: Animalia
- Phylum: Arthropoda
- Clade: Pancrustacea
- Class: Insecta
- Order: Hymenoptera
- Family: Vespidae
- Genus: Vespa
- Species: V. bellicosa

Binomial name
- Vespa bellicosa de Saussure

Species of hornet

Vespa bellicosa is a rare species of hornet endemic to the lowland tropical forests of Borneo and Sumatra. It was described by Henri Louis Frédéric de Saussure in 1854.
