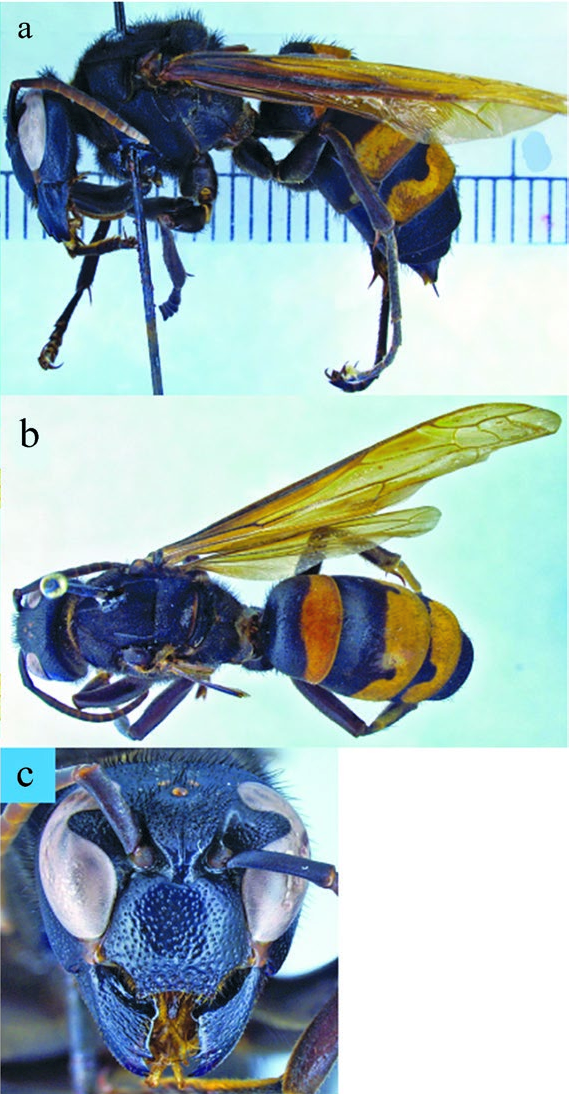
- Vespa philippinensis. (a) Lateral view. (b) Dorsal view. (c) Front view of face.

Scientific classification
- Kingdom: Animalia
- Phylum: Arthropoda
- Clade: Pancrustacea
- Class: Insecta
- Order: Hymenoptera
- Family: Vespidae
- Genus: Vespa
- Species: V. philippinensis

Binomial name
- Vespa philippinensis de Saussure, 1854

= Vespa philippinensis =

Philippine hornet

Species of hornet

Vespa philippinensis, the Philippine hornet, is a species of rare hornet found in the Philippine Islands, primarily on the island of Negros. It is a ground-nesting species with a similar body structure to that of Vespa tropica. Only one known occurrence of the hornets' nest has been recorded, where a colony was found and collected, although there have been 12 sightings of individuals before. It was described by Henri Louis Frédéric de Saussure in 1854.
