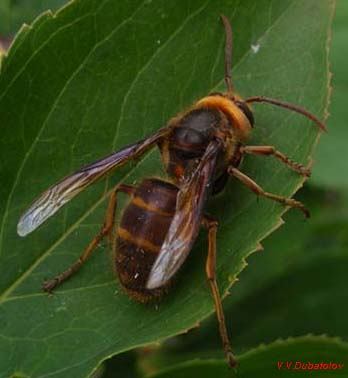

Scientific classification
- Kingdom: Animalia
- Phylum: Arthropoda
- Clade: Pancrustacea
- Class: Insecta
- Order: Hymenoptera
- Family: Vespidae
- Genus: Vespa
- Species: V. binghami

Binomial name
- Vespa binghami du Buysson, 1905

= Vespa binghami =

Bingham's hornet

Species of Hornet

Vespa binghami, also known as Bingham's hornet, is a species of hornet found in northern Thailand, Myanmar, Laos, parts of India, parts of China, Korea, and parts of Russia.

== Description ==
Vespa binghami is a medium to large-sized hornet. The size of workers average to 30mm, with a forewing size ranging between 19.0mm to 25.6mm in both males and females. The colour of the hornets can vary, with ones found in Southeast Asia having a brown body with a yellow head, and ones found in Russia and Korea being mostly brown with yellow markings on the abdomen. The key distinguishing feature of Vespa binghami are that the ocelli are much larger than those found in other related species.

== Distribution ==
Vespa binghami are found in the Chiang Mai region of northern Thailand, Myanmar, Laos, parts of India, parts of China, (Yunnan and Sichuan) the peninsula of Korea, (discovered in Korea in 1925.) and in parts of Russia. (Primor'ye and Sakhalin.)

== Behaviours ==
Not much is known about the behaviours of Vespi binghami due to it being a rarely sighted species despite its range. Unlike other hornet species, Vespa binghami are nocturnal creatures, and may be the reason behind the enlarged oculli that it possesses. A study on the South Korean hornet population found that they prefer to prey on Noctuoidea species and like to choose tree cavities for nesting.
