= Xanthopterin =

Names
- IUPAC name Xanthopterin

Identifiers
CAS Number	119-44-8
3D model (JSmol)	Interactive image
ChemSpider	8091
ECHA InfoCard	100.003.932
PubChem CID	8397
UNII	V66551EU1R
CompTox Dashboard (EPA)	DTXSID70152282
- InChI: InChI=1S/C6H5N5O2/c7-6-10-4-3(5(13)11-6)9-2(12)1-8-4/h1H,(H,9,12)(H3,7,8,10,11,13) Key: VURKRJGMSKJIQX-UHFFFAOYSA-N; InChI=1S/C6H5N5O2/c7-6-10-4-3(5(13)11-6)9-2(12)1-8-4/h1H,(H,9,12)(H3,7,8,10,11,13)
- SMILES: O=C1/N=C(\NC=2/N=C\C(=O)NC1=2)N

Properties
Chemical formula	C_{6}H_{5}N_{5}O_{2}
- Except where otherwise noted, data are given for materials in their standard state (at 25 °C [77 °F], 100 kPa). verify (what is ?) Infobox references

Xanthopterin is a yellow, crystalline solid that occurs mainly in the wings of butterflies and in the urine of mammals. Small microorganisms convert it into folic acid. It is the end product of a non-conjugated pteridine compound and inhibits the growth of lymphocytes produced by concanavalin. High levels of the chemical were found in patients with liver disease and hemolysis, the latter increasing levels by 35%.

It was suggested, without direct proof, that the Oriental hornet uses xanthopterin as a light-harvesting molecule to transform light into electrical energy, which explains why the insects are more active when light intensity is greater. It remains an active and controversial area of scientific research (Plotkin et al., Naturwissenschaften (2010) 97:1067–1076).
