= Mastoparan =

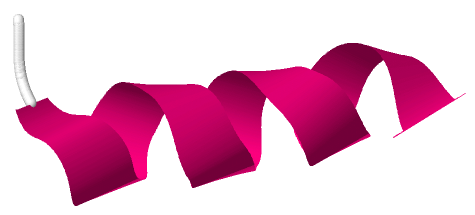
- Solution structure of mastoparan found in hornet and Vespa simillima xanthoptera.

Identifiers
- Symbol: Mastoparan_2
- Pfam: PF08251
- InterPro: IPR013214
- TCDB: 1.C.32
- OPM superfamily: 151
- OPM protein: 2czp
Available protein structures:
- PDB: IPR013214 PF08251 (ECOD; PDBsum)
- AlphaFold: IPR013214; PF08251

Mastoparan is a peptide toxin from wasp venom. It has the chemical structure Ile-Asn-Leu-Lys-Ala-Leu-Ala-Ala-Leu-Ala-Lys-Lys-Ile-Leu-NH2.

The net effect of mastoparan's mode of action depends on cell type, but seemingly always involves exocytosis. In mast cells, this takes the form of histamine secretion, while in platelets and chromaffin cells release serotonin and catecholamines are found, respectively. Mastoparan activity in the anterior pituitary gland leads to prolactin release.

In the case of histamine secretion, the effect of mastoparan takes place via its interference with G protein activity. By stimulating the GTPase activity of certain subunits, mastoparan shortens the lifespan of active G protein. At the same time, it promotes dissociation of any bound GDP from the protein, enhancing GTP binding. In effect, the GTP turnover of G proteins is greatly increased by mastoparan. These properties of the toxin follow from the fact that it structurally resembles activated G protein receptors when placed in a phospholipid environment. The resultant G protein-mediated signaling cascade leads to intracellular IP_{3} release and the resultant influx of Ca^{2+}.

Research has shown that mastoparan inhibits all developmental forms of Trypanosoma cruzi, the parasite that is responsible for Chagas disease.

== Structural transition ==
In an experimental study conducted by Tsutomu Higashijima and his counterparts, mastoparan was compared to melittin, which is found in bee venom. Mainly, the structure and reaction to phosphate was studied in each toxin. Using Circular Dichroism (CD), it was found that when mastoparan was exposed to methanol, an alpha helical form existed. It was concluded that strong intramolecular hydrogen bonding occurred. Also, two negative bands were present on the CD spectrum. In an aqueous environment, mastoparan took on a nonhelical, unordered form. In this case, only one negative band was observed on the CD spectrum. Adding phosphate buffer to mastoparan resulted in no effect.

Melittin produced a different conformational change than mastoparan. In an aqueous solution, melittin went from a nonhelical form to an alpha helix when phosphate was added to the solution. The binding of melittin to the membrane was believed to result from electrostatic interactions, not hydrophobic interactions.

== Attempts to remove mastoparan toxicity ==
Despite the toxic effects to mammalian cells, mastoparan is also a potential antibiotic template due to its potent antimicrobial activity. In design study performed by Irazazabal and co-workers (2016), it was demonstrated that the inclusion of an isoleucine and an arginine residue at positions 5 and 8 respectively [I5, R8], dramatically reduced the toxicity of mastoparan, turning it into a potentially valuable drug for fighting infectious disease.
