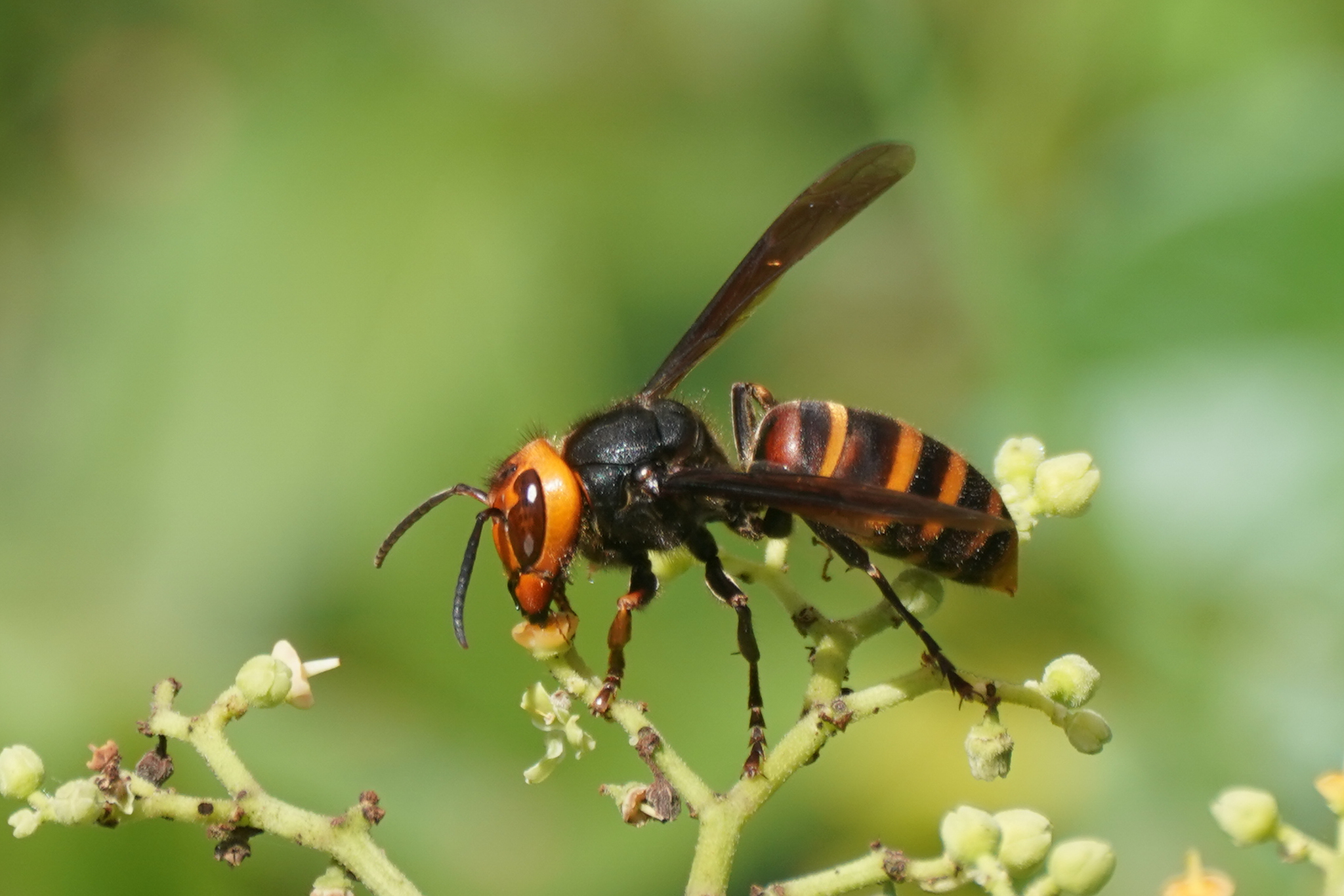
- Yellow-vented hornet in Japan

Scientific classification
- Kingdom: Animalia
- Phylum: Arthropoda
- Clade: Pancrustacea
- Class: Insecta
- Order: Hymenoptera
- Family: Vespidae
- Genus: Vespa
- Species: V. analis

Binomial name
- Vespa analis Fabricius, 1775

Synonyms
- Vespa hekouensis Dong and Wang; Vespa maguanensis Dong

= Vespa analis =

Species of hornet

Vespa analis, the yellow-vented hornet, is a species of common hornet found in Southeast Asia.

== Taxonomy ==
This species has no recognised subspecies, and at least two described species are considered synonymous with it.

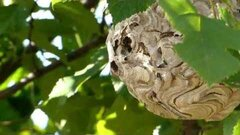
A nest belonging to V. analis

== Sources ==
"Vespa analis" at http://www.vespa-bicolor.net/main/vespid/vespa-analis.htm accessed on 11 October 2020
