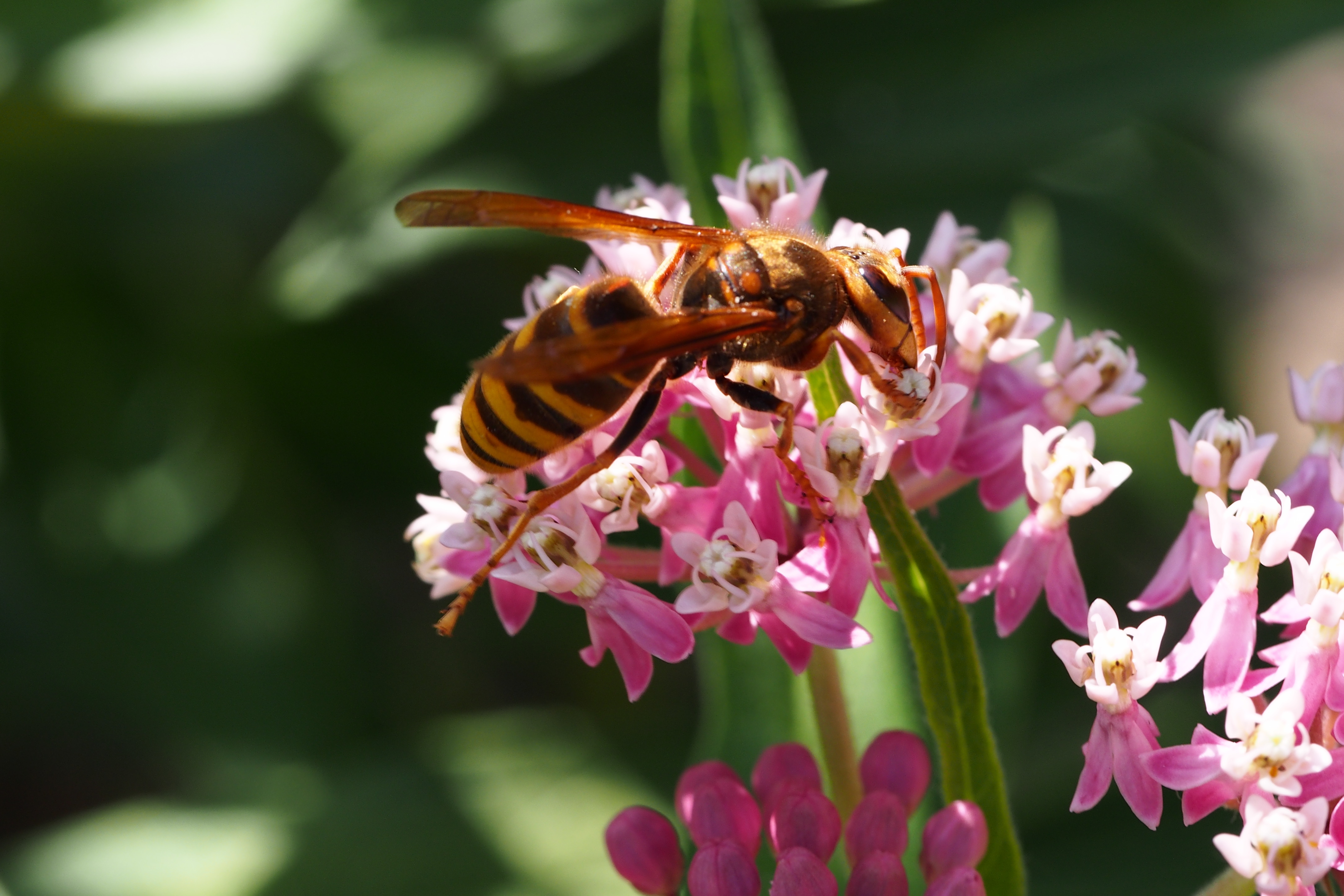
- Vespa simillima

Scientific classification
- Kingdom: Animalia
- Phylum: Arthropoda
- Clade: Pancrustacea
- Class: Insecta
- Order: Hymenoptera
- Family: Vespidae
- Genus: Vespa
- Species: V. simillima

Binomial name
- Vespa simillima Smith, 1868

Synonyms
- Vespa mongolica André 1884; Vespa micado Cameron 1903; Vespa xanthoptera Cameron 1903; Vespa Mongolica var. sexpunctata Pérez 1905; Vespa Mongolica var. flavata Pérez 1910

= Vespa simillima =

Species of hornet

Vespa simillima, the yellow hornet, including the color form known as the Japanese hornet or Japanese yellow hornet (キイロスズメバチ), is a common hornet species in the Eastern Hemisphere. The typical mainland color form (Japanese: ケブカスズメバチ, Korean: 털보말벌, 'hairy wasp') is darker and hairier than the yellow form; it lives in Hokkaido, the Korean Peninsula, Eastern Siberia and China, but is less common elsewhere in Japan, where the yellow color form predominates. It should not be confused with the Asian giant hornet (Vespa mandarinia), which has a color form sometimes referred to as the "Japanese giant hornet". While there is a history of recognizing subspecies within many hornets, the most recent taxonomic revision treats all subspecific names in the genus Vespa as synonyms, effectively relegating them to no more than informal names for regional color forms.

== Behavior ==
V. simillima colonies are all founded by one single foundress, the same with all other species in their genus. The queen performs all tasks, including egg laying, foraging, and nest building, until workers begin to hatch. This can sometimes lead to nests dying out early in the nesting period, if the queen is killed while foraging before workers can hatch. As the number of workers grows, the division of labor gradually shifts with the queen ultimately only performing egg laying and larval trophallaxis. The average time from egg to adult for V. simillima is 30.8 days, and the average length of survival for adult workers is 12.9 days. Adult mortality rate increases constantly after the start of foraging activities outside the nest.

V. simillima are solitary predators, hunting and foraging alone. Food gathered by workers is handed over at the nest, where other workers distribute it among larvae and other nest mates. Nest material is immediately treated and applied to the nest directly by the gathering worker, not passed to a different worker.

== Diet ==
Like other Vespa species, the V. simillima diet consists of liquids, primarily for carbohydrates, and solids, primarily for protein. Both of these sources are gathered primarily as food for larvae, however, liquids are also shared among adults. Main carbohydrate sources are tree sap, flower nectar, fruits, and discarded candy. A wide variety of insects and spiders are the most common sources of protein, with over 40 species across 8 orders recorded as prey.

== Nesting ==
V. simillima has the largest colony and nest size of Vespa species in Japan, with observed nests ranging commonly from 1,000 to over 10,000 cells. They have a nesting period (time from foundation to disintegration of a nest) of approximately seven months, though it is known to vary with temperature, latitude, and elevation. It is the only species of genus Vespa that demonstrates a high level of adaptability in nesting, with nesting sites ranging from open to enclosed sites both above and below ground, along with the ability to relocate colonies in the middle of the nesting period. In man-made environments, V. simillima nests have been found in attics, under eaves, and inside walls or ventilation holes. In natural environments, it nests in hollow trees, underground cavities, on rock walls, and inside bushes. They are known to use a variety of living or dead trees as nesting material, including Japanese cedar, pine, bamboo, oak, and peach. Due to their nest structure, it is believed that V. simillima evolved from a species that nested exclusively in open spaces rather than enclosed.

Nests of the yellow hornet are sometimes attacked by the parasitic species known as the black hornet (Vespa dybowskii). In the early stage of nesting, the black hornet queen attacks the queens of other hornets, including the yellow hornet and European hornet. If the assault succeeds, it will usurp the nest to produce its offspring, assisted by the workers of the former owner. Along with other insects in Japan and Korea, V. simillima are prey to the Asian giant hornet, in which the attacking Asian giant hornets will battle to take control of the nest, exterminate workers, and ultimately carry all larvae and pupae back to their own nest as a food source.
