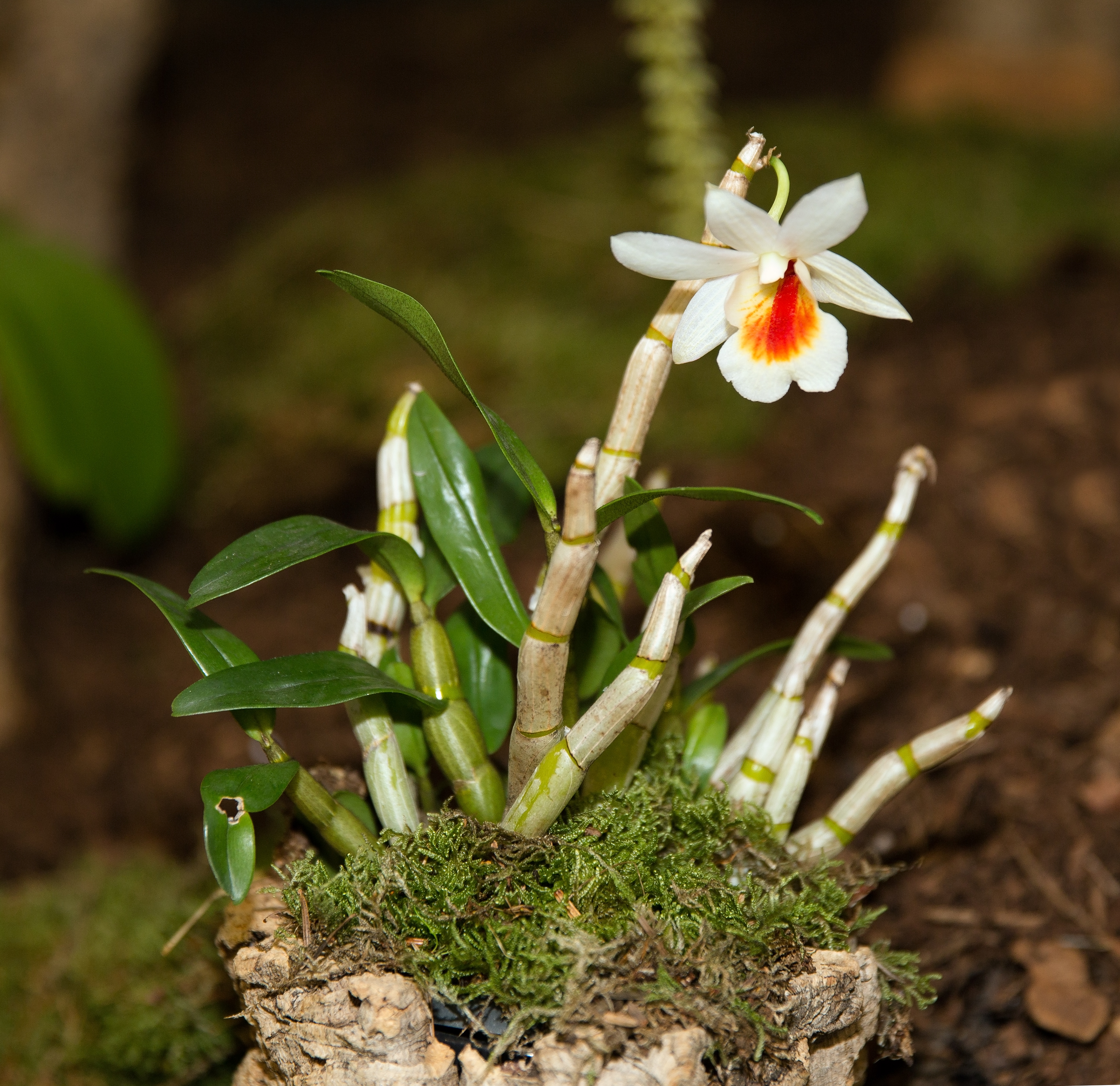
- Dendrobium christyanum

Conservation status
- Endangered (IUCN 3.1)

Scientific classification
- Kingdom: Plantae
- Clade: Tracheophytes
- Clade: Angiosperms
- Clade: Monocots
- Order: Asparagales
- Family: Orchidaceae
- Subfamily: Epidendroideae
- Genus: Dendrobium
- Species: D. christyanum

Binomial name
- Dendrobium christyanum Rchb.f.

Synonyms
- Dendrobium fuerstenbergianum Schltr.; Dendrobium margaritaceum Finet; Dendrobium sinense Tang & F.T.Wang

= Dendrobium christyanum =

Species of orchid

Dendrobium christyanum is a species of orchid (Orchidaceae) endemic to the Chinese island of Hainan.

It produces a volatile organic compound that is unrecorded in other plant species. The flowers of this orchid produce a bee pheromone which attracts its pollinator, Vespa bicolor, a species of hornet. The novel feature, first reported in 2009, is supposed to mimic the distress pheromone of the indigenous Asian honey bee Apis cerana (the same chemical as in the European Apis mellifera, which does not occur naturally on Hainan). The chemical compound, (Z)-11-eicosen-1-ol, can be detected by the hornet and is it is assumed this mimicry deceives the insect into visiting the flower without reward (the flowers offer no nectar). V. bicolor preys on honey bees to feed its larvae. The European beewolf (Philanthus triangulum) is also able to detect this compound when hunting bees.
