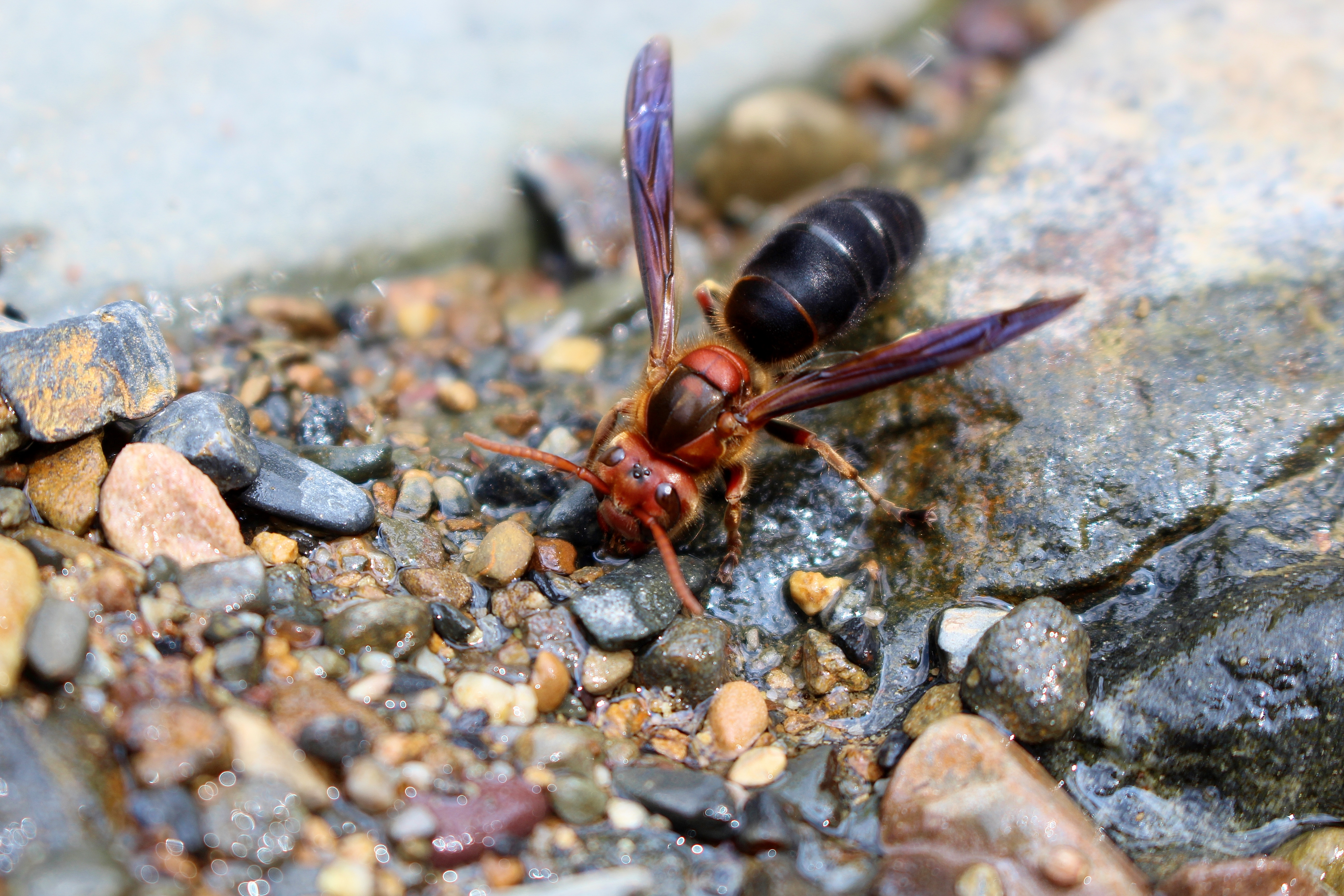

Scientific classification
- Kingdom: Animalia
- Phylum: Arthropoda
- Clade: Pancrustacea
- Class: Insecta
- Order: Hymenoptera
- Family: Vespidae
- Genus: Vespa
- Species: V. basalis

Binomial name
- Vespa basalis Smith, 1852

= Black-bellied hornet =

Species of hornet

The black-bellied hornet (Vespa basalis) is a species of hornet native to Taiwan. It is one of the most dangerous species of hornet on the island, and its venom induces edema. Colonies may have as many as 5,000 individual hornets.

== Distribution ==
=== Introduced ===
None known. One specimen was photographed in Richmond, British Columbia, Canada, in July 2019 and was identified by several experts as V. basalis. However there have been no other sightings and is not believed to represent a local population.
