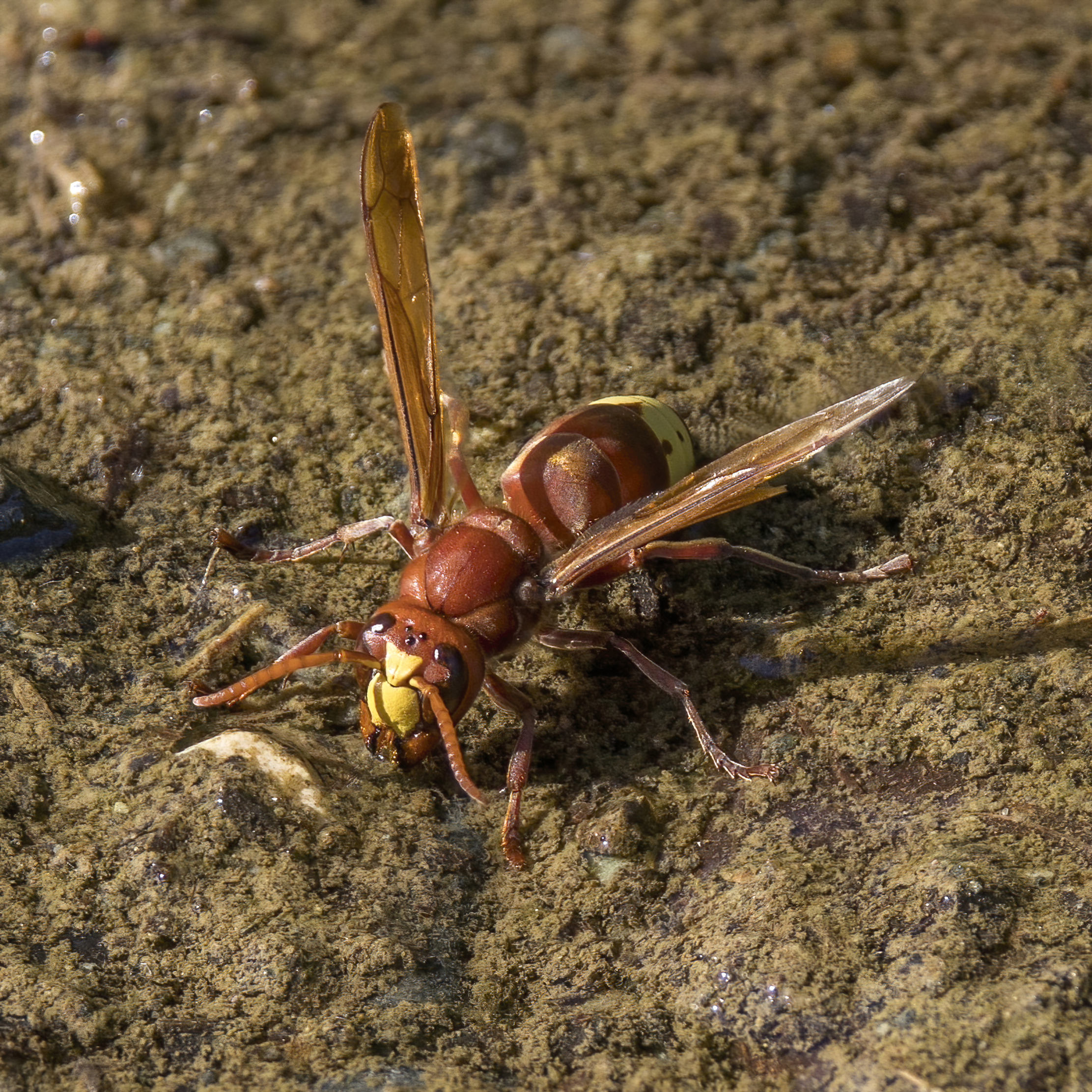
- in Cyprus

Conservation status
- Data Deficient (IUCN 3.1)

Scientific classification
- Kingdom: Animalia
- Phylum: Arthropoda
- Clade: Pancrustacea
- Class: Insecta
- Order: Hymenoptera
- Family: Vespidae
- Genus: Vespa
- Species: V. orientalis

Binomial name
- Vespa orientalis Linnaeus, 1771
- Distribution of Vespa orientalis

= Oriental hornet =

Species of hornet

The Oriental hornet (Vespa orientalis) is a social insect species of the family Vespidae. It can be found in Southwest Asia, Northeast Africa, the island of Madagascar (but no reports have been made of its presence on the island for many years), the Middle East, Central Asia, and parts of Southern Europe. Oriental hornets have also been found in a few isolated locations such as Mexico and Chile due to human introduction. The Oriental hornet lives in seasonal colonies consisting of caste system dominated by a queen. The hornet builds its nests underground and communicates using sound vibrations. The hornet has a yellow stripe on its cuticle (exoskeleton), which can absorb sunlight to generate a small electrical potential, and this might help supply energy for digging. The adult hornet eats nectar and fruits and scavenges for insects and animal proteins to feed to its young. Because they are scavengers, the hornets may also serve as a transmitter of disease following consumption of infected plants. The hornets are a primary pest to honey bees, attacking bee colonies to obtain honey and animal proteins. The sting of an Oriental hornet can be quite painful to humans and some humans are allergic to stings.

== Taxonomy and phylogeny ==
The Oriental hornet (V. orientalis) belongs to the family Vespidae, which consists of wasps, hornets, and yellowjackets. It is a member of the genus Vespa, which constitutes true hornets. V. orientalis has unique adaptations to arid climates, which has made it difficult to assess its phylogenetic relationship to other species of the genus Vespa, based on morphological data alone. Thus, only recently has the use of molecular phylogenetics given evidence that V. orientalis is most closely related to Vespa affinis and Vespa mocsaryana. While a history exists of recognizing subspecies within many of the hornets, including V. orientalis, the most recent taxonomic revision of the genus treats all subspecific names in the genus Vespa as synonyms, effectively relegating them to no more than informal names for regional color forms.

== Description and identification ==
The adult hornet has two pairs of wings and a body measuring between 25 and 35 mm (0.98 and 1.38 in) long. Drones and workers are smaller in size than the queen. V. orientalis is a reddish-brown color and has distinctive thick yellow bands on the abdomen and yellow patches on the head between the eyes. It has very strong jaws and will bite if provoked. Females (workers and the queen) have an ovipositor, which is a specialized organ shaped like a tube that is used for laying eggs. The ovipositor extends from the end of the abdomen and is also used as a stinger. Males (drones) can be distinguished from workers by the number of segments on their antenna. Drones have 13 segments, while workers only have 12. The Oriental hornet looks similar to the European hornet (V. crabro) and should not be confused with the Asian giant hornet (V. mandarinia) of East Asia.

== Distribution ==
Oriental hornets can be found in Central Asia, southwestern Asia from Armenia and Turkey to India and Nepal, throughout the Middle East, in Northeast Africa, in some Afrotropical countries such as Ethiopia and Somalia, and in parts of Southern Europe: Croatia, Bosnia, Montenegro, North Macedonia, Albania, Greece, Spain, Bulgaria, Cyprus, Malta, Sicily, Sardinia and the southern half of peninsular Italy. Oriental hornets have been introduced by humans into additional locations, including Chile, Madagascar, Mexico, and Xinjiang, China, as well as the occasional introduction via fruit into Belgium and the United Kingdom. The Oriental hornet is the only member of the genus Vespa that can be found in desert climates such as those in North Africa, the Middle East, and parts of southwestern Asia.

=== Nests ===
The Oriental hornet typically lives in nests that it digs underground. On the roof base of each comb cell one or more mineral granules of polycrystalline material is attached. A nest contains multiple combs in which the colony lives. While nests are most commonly found under ground, some paper nests are constructed in protective hollows such as inside hollow trees, in shipping containers, parked vehicles, and aircraft. To construct the paper nests, the workers strip the bark from twigs, tree branches, and shrubs to collect fiber.

== Colonies ==
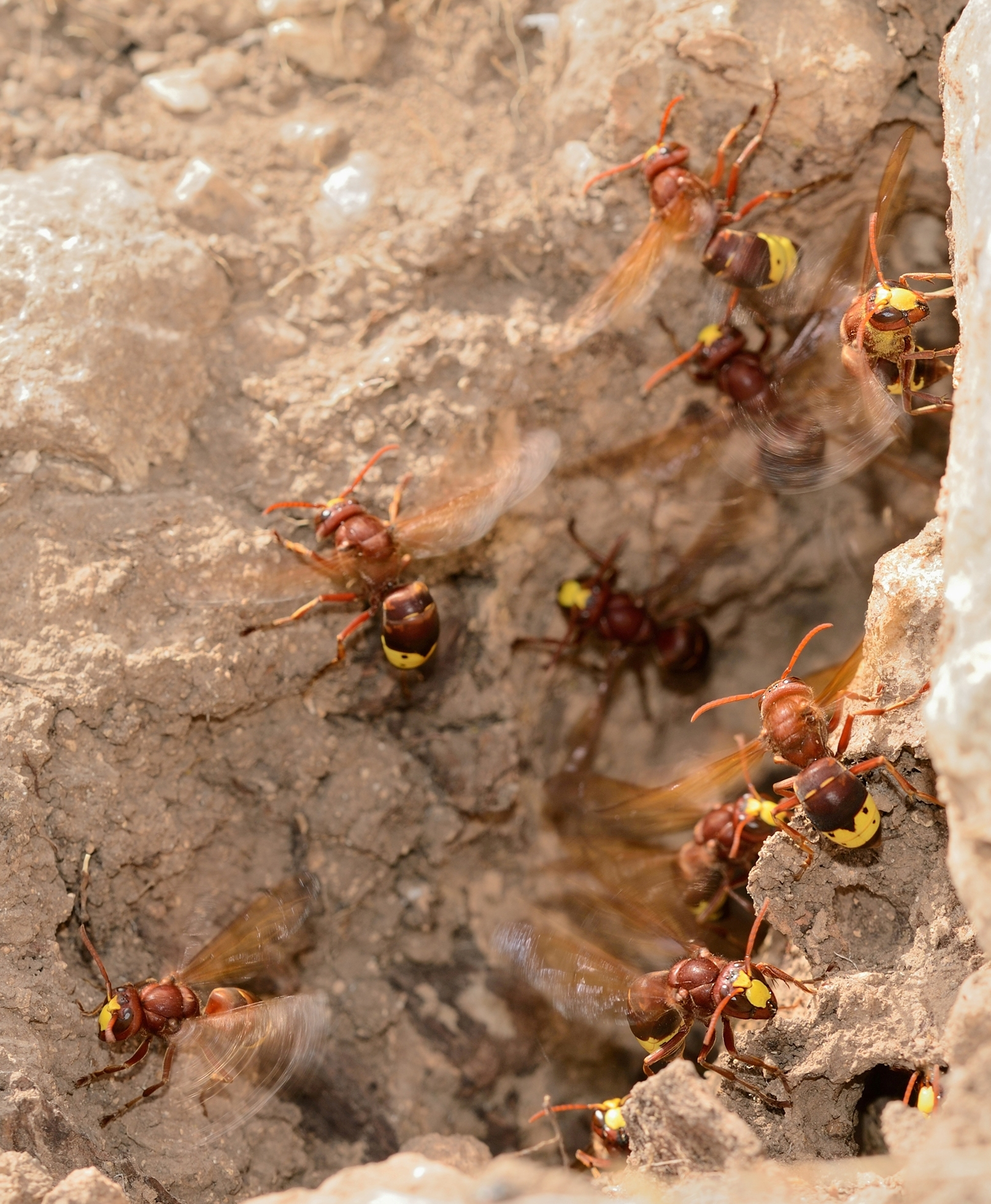
Workers at the nest entrance are fanning their wings to cool down the nest on a hot midday.

Oriental hornets live in seasonal colonies that are formed every year in the spring by a single queen that mated during the previous fall. During the fall, the queen of an established colony lays eggs which will develop into new queens and drones. After mating, the drones die off, while the newly fertilized queens seek hideouts in which to hibernate for the winter. The newly founded colony grows throughout the spring and summer until the population and activity of the colony peaks in the late summer and early fall. The peak size of the colony is several thousand individuals and a colony typically contains three to six combs, each containing 600-900 individual cells.

== Behavior ==
V. orientalis is a type of social wasp. Individuals live collectively in colonies with one queen and thousands of workers. Social wasps are unusual in their practice of altruism in which nonreproductive individuals work for the benefit of the colony. This occurs because all individuals in a colony are closely related.

=== Social structure ===
Within a colony, the caste system is dominated by the queen that is the only reproductive female in the colony. Subordinate to the queen are the workers (daughters) and drones (sons). Like the queen, drones solely serve reproductive roles. The workers are responsible for the rest of the labor. Workers specialize in the performance of different tasks. Workers are responsible for foraging for food, providing shelter, defending the colony, and caring for the colony's brood, which consist of the queen's offspring.

=== Communication ===
Oriental hornets communicate through sound vibrations. The three main types of vibrations used to communicate are taps to the queen, awakening taps, and larval hunger signals. When workers tap while facing the queen, three effects are noted: the queen starts to search the combs for vacant cells in which to lay her eggs, the workers go back to performing their typical duties, and hunger signals by larvae cease immediately and are not resumed for at least 30 minutes. The main purpose of these taps seem to be to encourage the queen to lay more eggs. Awakening taps by workers cause a general intensification of activities in the colony. The effects are minimal during the day. At night, however, the vibrations wake the whole colony, which causes the larvae to commence their hunger signals and the workers to go forage for food to feed the larvae. Larval hunger signals produce no detectable changes in larval activity during the daytime. The workers, however, pay more attention and give more food to the cells that are in the vicinity of where the vibrations originated. At night, the larvae emulate each other's hunger signals and awaken the whole nest.

== Kin selection ==
V. orientalis hornets live in colonies in which the workers are all daughters of the queen, so the workers are all sisters. Social wasps are haplodiploid, which means that males are all haploid and develop from unfertilized eggs, while females are diploid and develop from eggs fertilized by drones. Queens commonly mate with only one drone. Each drone has only one set of chromosomes to pass on to its offspring. Thus, sister workers that share paternity are unusually closely related to each other. Each received 100% its father's genes and 50% of its mother's genes, so each is on average 75% related to its sisters and only 50% related to the queen. Thus, a worker is benefited by looking after the queen and her colony to best ensure the survival of its genes.

== Interactions with other species ==
=== Diet ===
Oriental hornets capture other insects such as grasshoppers, flies, honey bees, and vespids with which they feed the colony's brood. They will also collect other animal proteins for their young such as pieces of fresh or spoiled meat and fish. The adults eat carbohydrates such as nectar, honeydew, and fruits.

=== Conflict with bees ===
The best place for hornets to find a combination of animal proteins (bees or larvae) and carbohydrates (honey) are bee hives. Oriental hornets have been known to cause serious damage to bee colonies. They are the primary pest that attacks honey bee colonies in many countries.

== Sting ==
=== Antibacterial effect of venom ===
The venom of V. orientalis was tested on Gram-positive bacteria, Staphylococcus aureus and Bacillus subtilis, and Gram-negative bacteria, Escherichia coli and Klebsiella pneumoniae. Venom extract was shown to be effective in inhibiting the growth of Gram-positive bacteria. The venom is therefore regarded as a potential therapeutic agent.

== Physiology ==
=== Alcohol tolerance ===
Ethanol is nutritious but highly intoxicating for most animals, which typically tolerate only up to 4% in their diet. However, a 2024 study by Dr. Sofia Bouchebti et al found that oriental hornets fed sugary solutions containing up to 80% ethanol for a week showed no adverse effects on behavior or lifespan. The hornets have multiple copies of the alcohol dehydrogenase gene, helping them metabolize alcohol quickly. The hornets also carry Saccharomyces cerevisiae, also known as brewer's yeast, which ferments fruits. The oriental hornets are thus hypothesized to be in a symbiotic relationship with the yeast, "preserving" fruits for themselves by reducing competition for food from others.

=== Solar energy harvesting ===
Unlike most wasps which are most active during the early morning, V. orientalis is unique in showing a peak of activity during the middle of the day. Oriental hornets dig their nests underground by picking up soil in their mandibles, flying a short distance, dropping the soil, and returning to the nest to continue digging. The hornet's digging is correlated with insolation (solar energy). The more insolation, the more active the hornet. This daytime digging behavior of V. orientalis may be possible because of the ability of its cuticle to harvest solar energy.

==== Cuticle ====
The cuticle of the Oriental hornet contains yellow pigment that protects the cuticle from harmful UV radiation from the sun. The brown segments of the hornet's body contain melanin, which serves a similar purpose. The brown cuticle is composed of about 30 layers, the thickness of which increases from interior to exterior. The brown melanin pigment is found in these layers. The yellow cuticle is composed of 15 layers that contain yellow pigment. The yellow stripe contains xanthopterin in barrel-shaped granules. Both the brown and yellow cuticle absorbs 99 per cent of the visible light falling on them. The surface structure of the brown cuticles act as a diffraction grating, trapping more light inside the cuticle layers.

==== Electric potential ====
Enzyme activity in the layer of yellow xanthopterin granules was demonstrated to be higher in hornets kept in dark environments and lower in those exposed to ultraviolet (UV) light. Measuring the electric voltage between the hypocuticle and the exocuticle of the yellow stripe shows a negative electric potential at the hypocuticle with respect to the positive exocuticle. If the yellow stripe is exposed to light, the potential difference between light and dark conditions increases. In dark conditions, the stripe decreases in electric potential. Pterins have a role in photoreception and phototransduction of near-UV light to blue light and pterins may play a role in photosynthesis. Some of the same researchers speculate that this is the energy for the heat organ (see #Thermoregulatory organ below).

Also, the silk has shown to have similar electric properties when exposed to light.

=== Thermoregulatory organ ===
There is a thermoregulatory organ in the thorax of V. orientalis. It maintains at 6 °C (11 °F) higher than the rest of the body, and 9 °C (16 °F) above ambient. (Specifically it is located in the dorsal part of the thorax, inward from the meso-scutal plate of the prothorax. This organ is near the median notal suture. It is 1 millimetre (3/64 in) in diameter and butterfly-shaped. The uppermost, hindmost side abuts the base of the forewings.) The authors speculate that this heat generation is powered by the Electric potential (above) that some of the same authors have previously discovered and investigated.

== Research and experiments ==
=== Zero gravity experiment ===
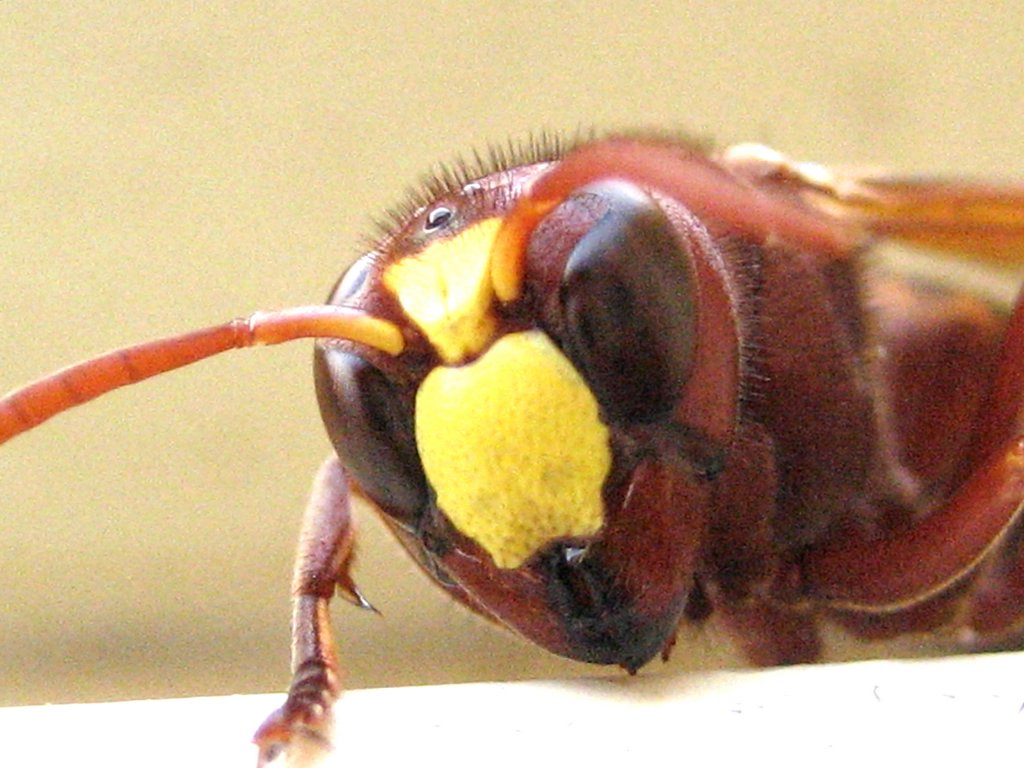
Face of an Oriental hornet, photo taken in Masada National Park, Israel

The Israeli Space Agency Investigation About Hornets (ISAIAH) was a project from Tel-Aviv University initiated in 1984 to explore the effects of near-zero gravity on oriental hornets, their development, and their nest-building instincts. The experiments were funded by the Israel Space Agency with the goal of discovering ways to prevent astronauts from suffering headaches, nausea, and vomiting during the missions. The sample of 230 Oriental hornets, flight hardware, and measuring instruments were all packed onto the Space Shuttle Endeavour, mission STS-47, in 1992, while a control group was kept on the ground for comparison.

During the launch, 202 hornets died as a result of a malfunction in the water system that caused an abnormal increase in humidity. The surviving hornets lost their sense of direction, and unlike the control unit hornets, were unable to climb on the walls or stay in clusters. Instead, they stayed motionless and apart from each other. Roughly 3 to 4 days after returning to earth, the hornets started climbing on the walls again and building a nest. The surviving hornets lived for an average of 23 days, compared to an average survival of 43 days for the control group hornets.
