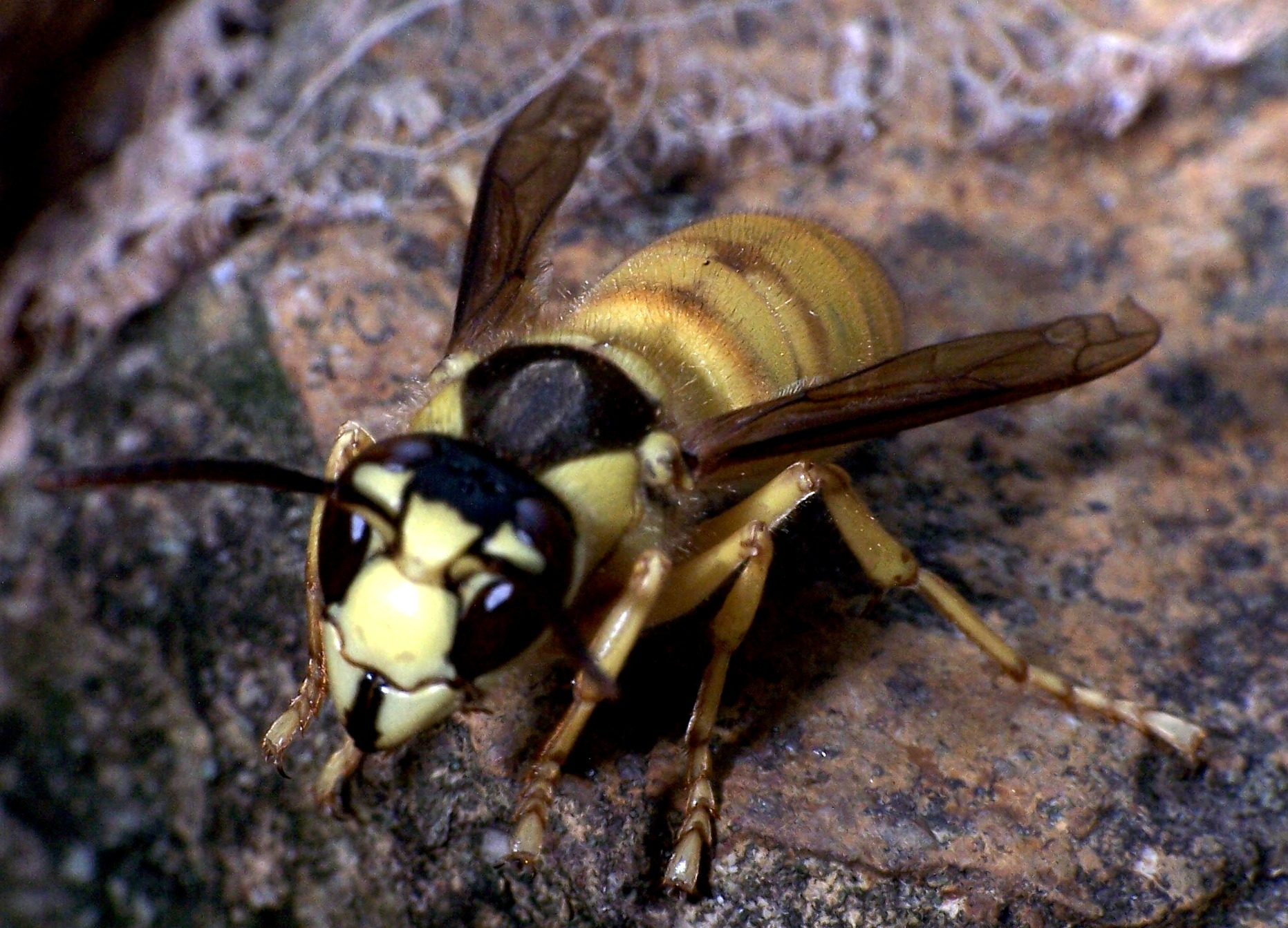

Scientific classification
- Kingdom: Animalia
- Phylum: Arthropoda
- Clade: Pancrustacea
- Class: Insecta
- Order: Hymenoptera
- Family: Vespidae
- Genus: Vespa
- Species: V. bicolor

Binomial name
- Vespa bicolor Fabricius, 1787

= Vespa bicolor =

Black shield wasp

Species of wasp

Vespa bicolor, the black shield wasp, described by Johan Christian Fabricius in 1787, is a species of hornet which has been found to be the pollinator of an orchid, Dendrobium sinense (syn. Dendrobium christyanum), found only on the Chinese island of Hainan. Vespa bicolor also preys on honey bees, which it feeds to its larvae. The orchid produces a chemical that mimics a honey bee pheromone and attracts this predatory wasp.

Vespa bicolor is the most common species of large wasp in Hong Kong, along with members of the genus Parapolybia. It is found in a wide range of environments and can be found near human dwellings.
