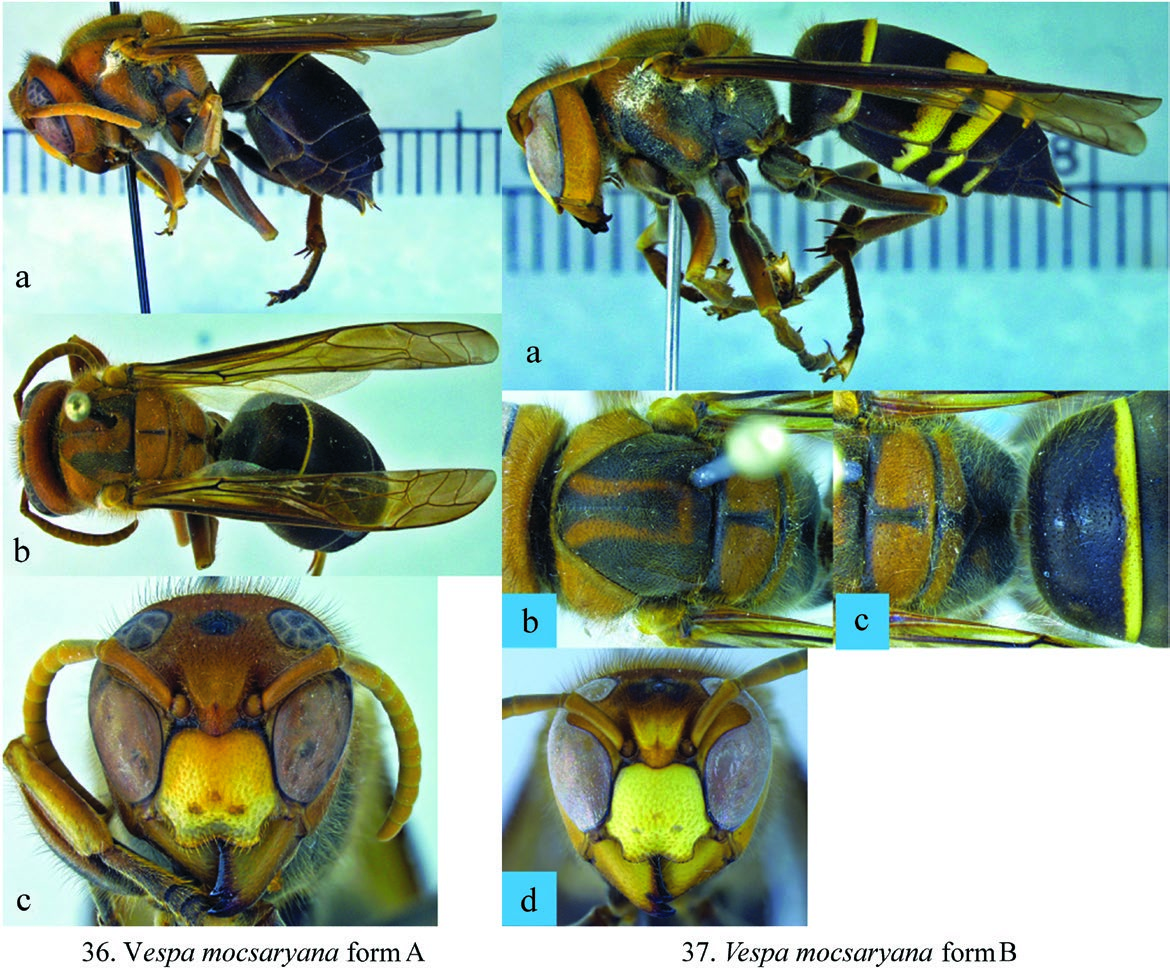

Scientific classification
- Kingdom: Animalia
- Phylum: Arthropoda
- Clade: Pancrustacea
- Class: Insecta
- Order: Hymenoptera
- Family: Vespidae
- Genus: Vespa
- Species: V. mocsaryana

Binomial name
- Vespa mocsaryana du Buysson, 1905

= Vespa mocsaryana =

Species of hornet

Vespa mocsaryana, the Mocsarian hornet, is a species of hornet endemic to far eastern India, parts of China, Indonesia, Malaysia, Myanmar, Laos, Thailand, and Vietnam. It was described by Robert du Buysson in 1905. The species was named after the village of Mocsa, Hungary.
