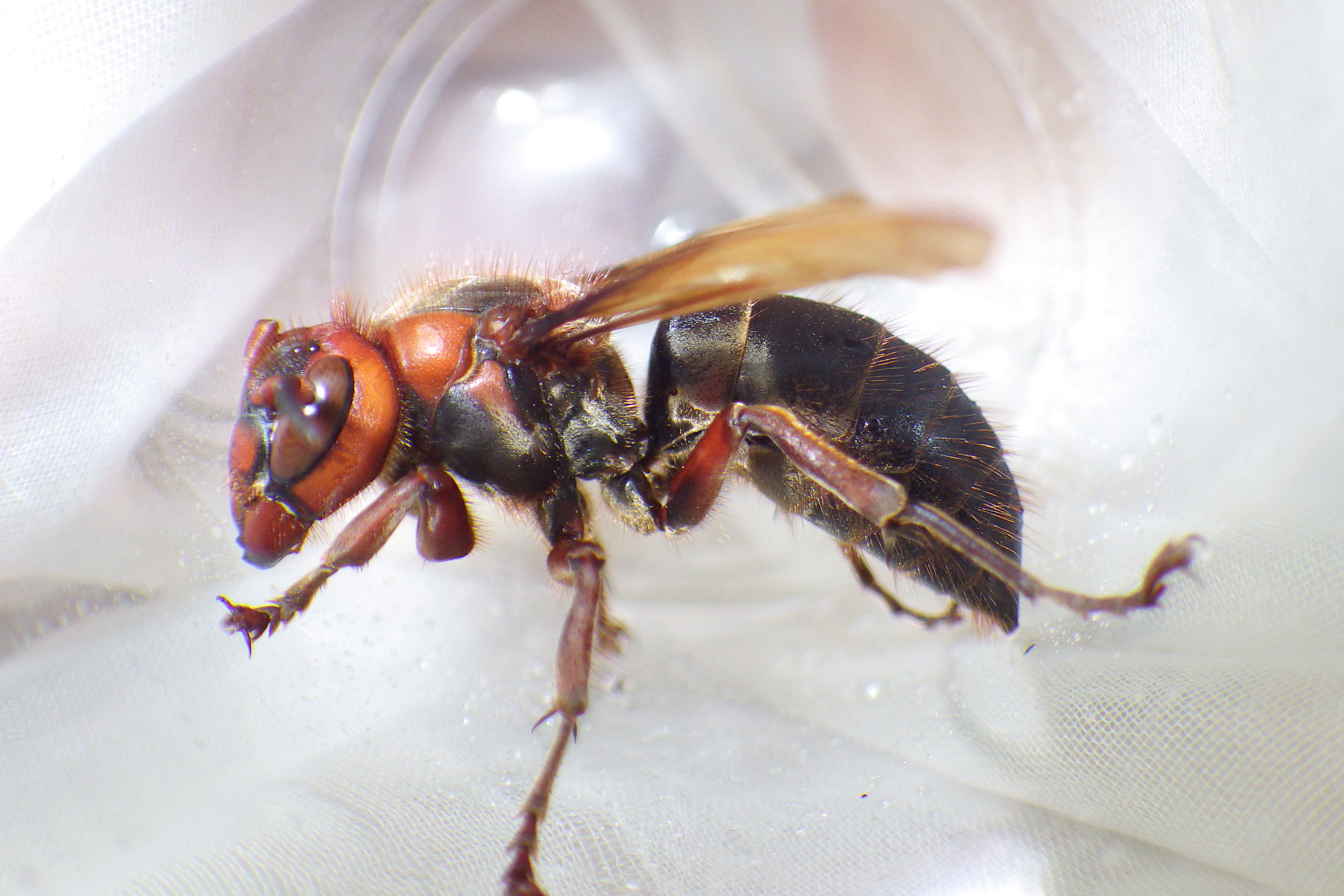

Scientific classification
- Kingdom: Animalia
- Phylum: Arthropoda
- Clade: Pancrustacea
- Class: Insecta
- Order: Hymenoptera
- Family: Vespidae
- Genus: Vespa
- Species: V. dybowskii

Binomial name
- Vespa dybowskii André, 1884

= Vespa dybowskii =

Dybowski's hornet

Species of hornet

Vespa dybowskii, also known as Dybowski's hornet, is a species of hornet found in East and Southeast Asia.
