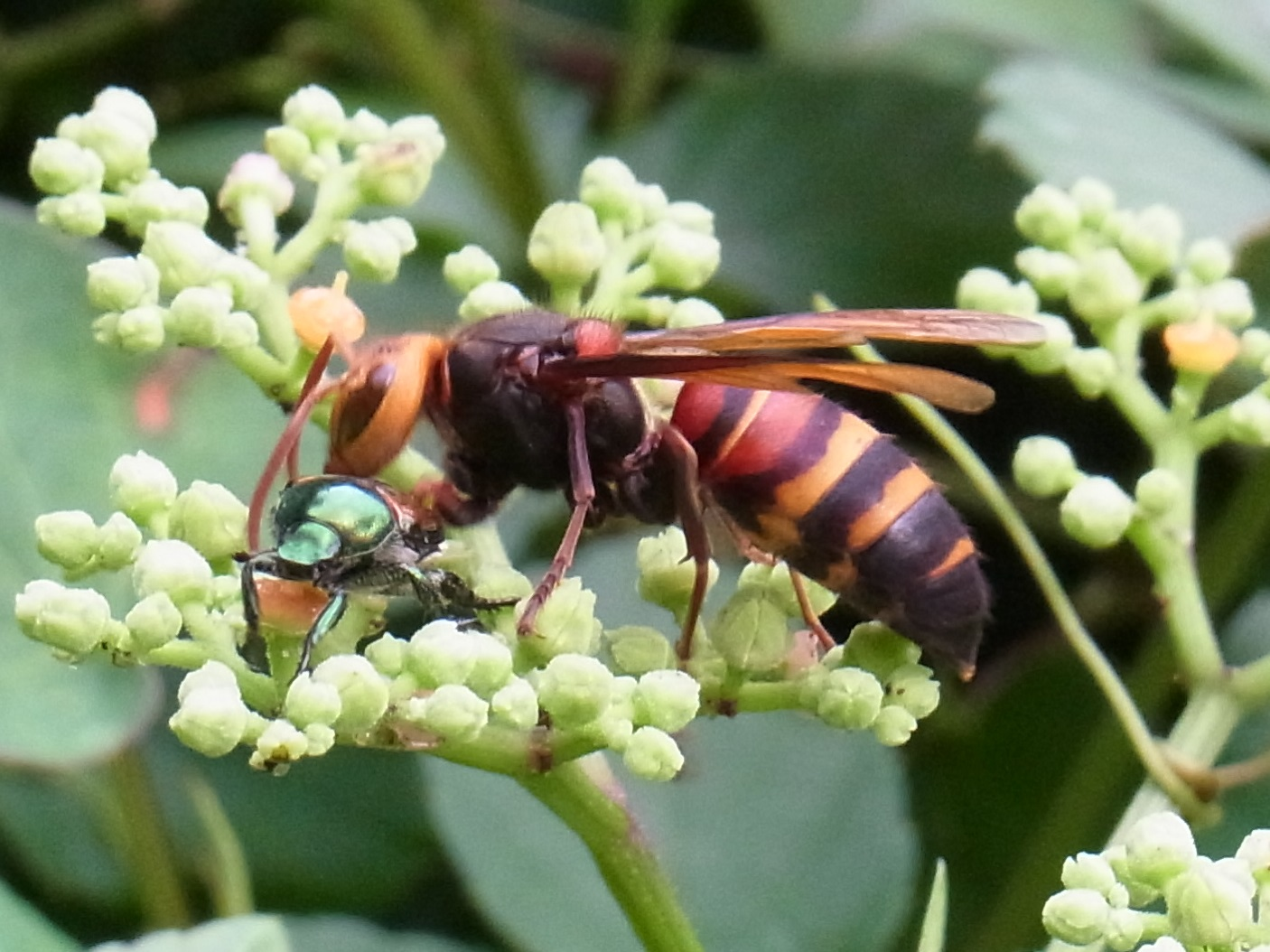

Scientific classification
- Kingdom: Animalia
- Phylum: Arthropoda
- Clade: Pancrustacea
- Class: Insecta
- Order: Hymenoptera
- Family: Vespidae
- Genus: Vespa
- Species: V. ducalis

Binomial name
- Vespa ducalis Smith, 1852

Synonyms
- Vespa matsumurai Sonan, 1935; Vespa esakii Sonan, 1935; Vespa pulchra Buysson, 1905

= Vespa ducalis =

Species of wasp

Vespa ducalis, the black-tailed hornet, is a species of hornet in the genus Vespa. It was described by Smith in 1852. In Japan, it is called himesuzumebachi (姫雀蜂; literally: "princess sparrow wasp").

== Description ==
Workers have a body length of 24–32 mm; the queen is about 37 mm. They have a distinctive black tail. They are only slightly smaller than the Asian giant hornet (Vespa mandarinia), which has a body length of about 30–55 mm.

== Distribution ==
It is found in Asia, including China (mainland), Hong Kong, India (northeast), Japan, the Korean Peninsula, Myanmar, Nepal, Siberia in Russia, Taiwan, Thailand and Vietnam (north and central parts).

== Behaviour ==
The larvae of Vespa ducalis feed primarily on the pupae and larvae of paper wasps. Adult Vespa ducalis often attack paper wasp nests to hunt larvae, typically ignoring the adults. They may repeatedly return to the same colony to raid it.

== Nest ==
Colonies are the smallest among species in the genus Vespa. Nests are built underground and typically contain around 50 individuals.

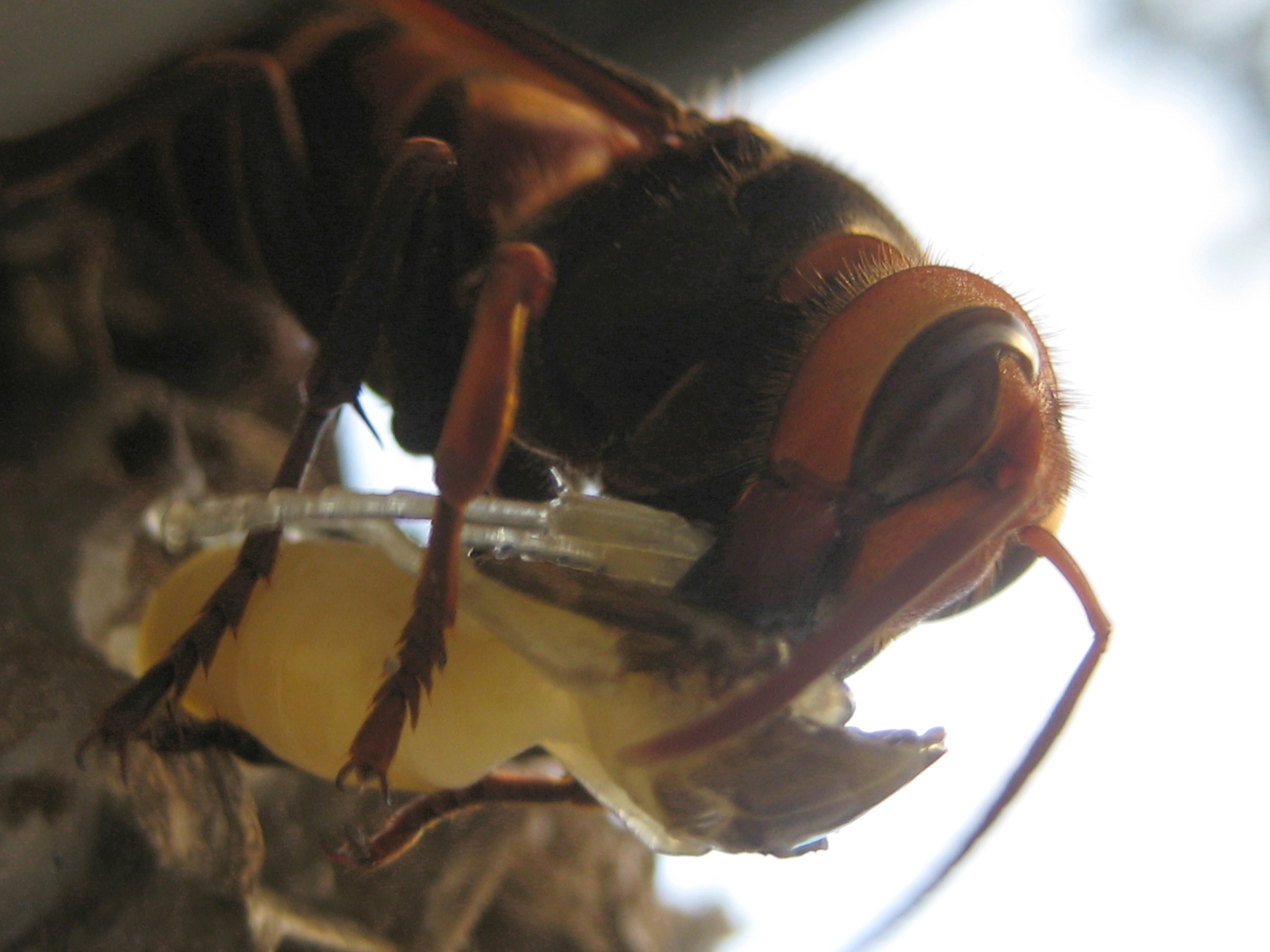
Vespa ducalis attacking the nest of a paper wasp

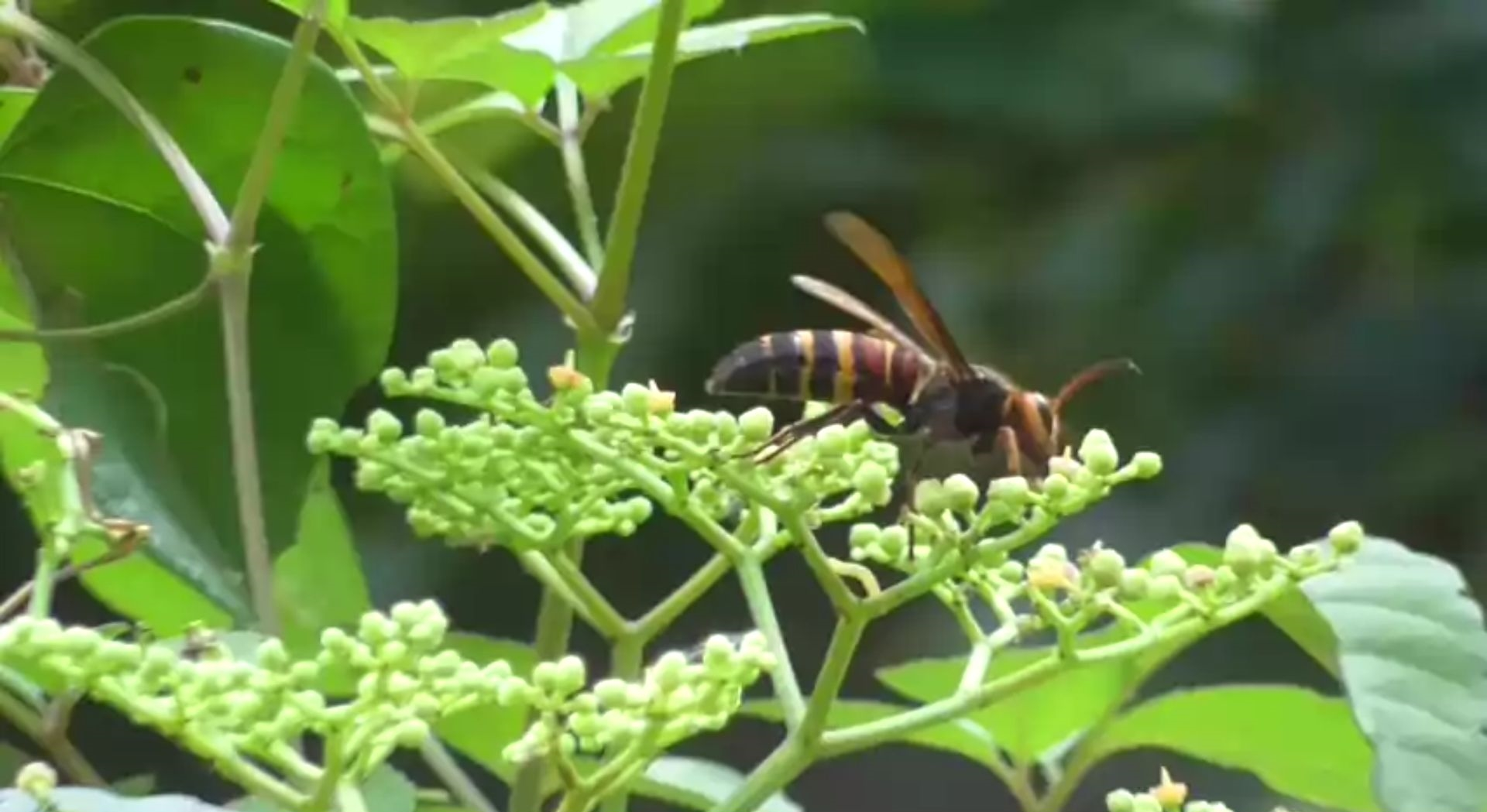
Black-tailed hornet in Japan
