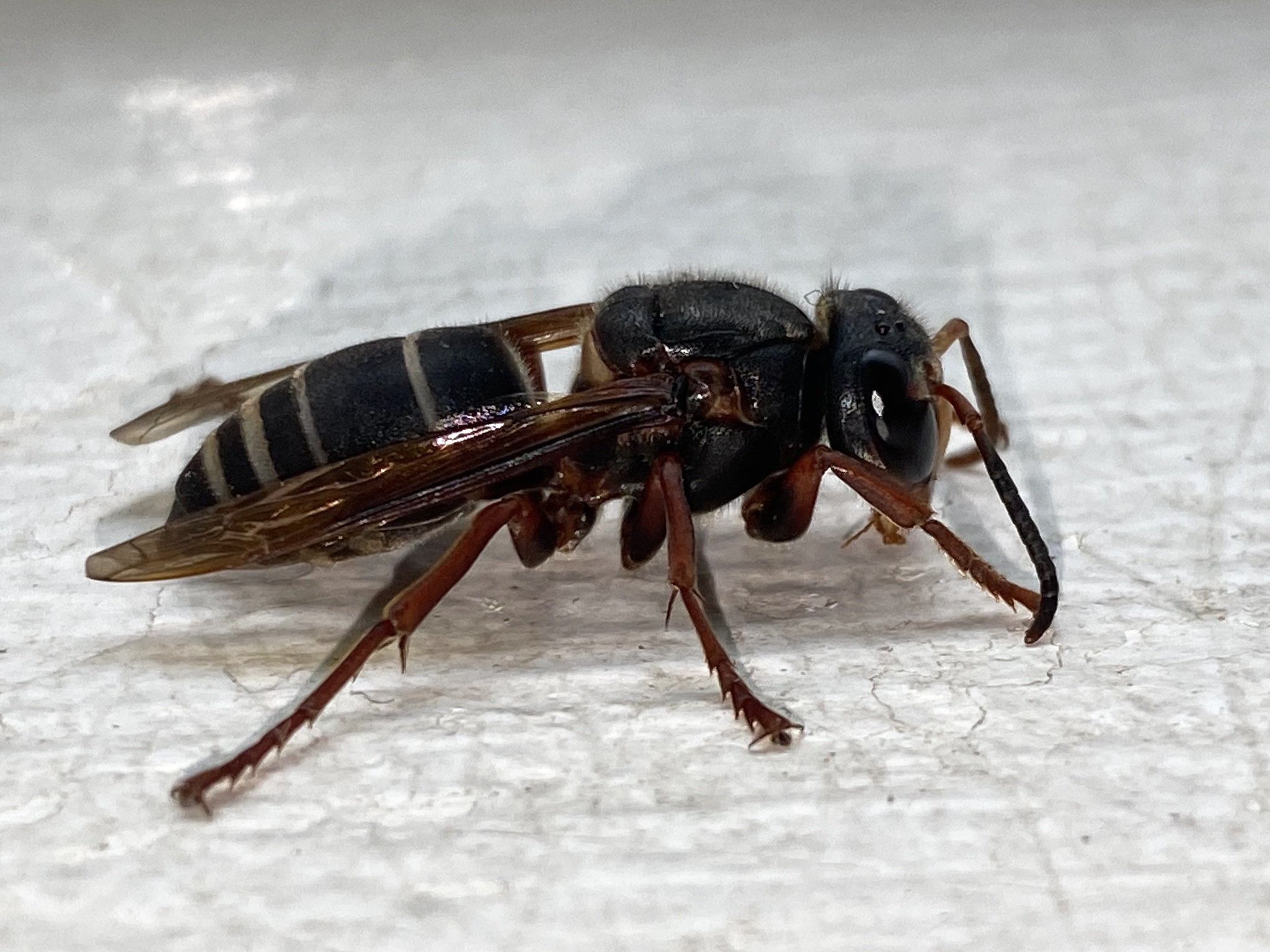
- Vespa luctuosa observed in Cebu City

Scientific classification
- Kingdom: Animalia
- Phylum: Arthropoda
- Clade: Pancrustacea
- Class: Insecta
- Order: Hymenoptera
- Family: Vespidae
- Genus: Vespa
- Species: V. luctuosa

Binomial name
- Vespa luctuosa Saussure, 1854

= Vespa luctuosa =

Species of hornet

Vespa luctuosa is a species of hornet which is endemic to the Philippines. The main subspecies is Vespa luctuosa luctuosa (primarily native to Luzon). Other known subspecies include Vespa luctuosa luzonensis (primarily native to the Visayas, including Leyte and Samar) and Vespa luctuosa negrosensis (native to Negros). Vespa luctuosa is known for its potent venom.

== Venom characteristics ==
The venom of Vespa luctuosa has the highest recorded toxicity to mice of any wasp species tested. The LD_{50} of the venom is 1.6 mg/kg. The toxicity (measured against mice) per weight of Vespa luctuosa venom is higher than that of the larger Asian giant hornet (Vespa mandarinia), which has an LD_{50} of 4.0 mg/kg, but which is responsible for many more human deaths than Vespa luctuosa due to the considerably larger volume of venom injected per sting.

In addition to being the most venomous known wasp, Vespa luctuosa has one of the highest recorded toxicities of any known insect venom. Only harvester ant venom from the genus Pogonomyrmex (especially Pogonomyrmex maricopa), as well as the unrelated ant species Ectatomma tuberculatum, are known to be more toxic.

In addition to pain at the sting site(s), symptoms of severe Vespa luctuosa envenomation include convulsions, cyanosis, and hematuria.

== Nesting ==
Vespa luctuosa tends to build hanging nests in trees and bushes. It only rarely builds nests in human structures and dwellings. The nests built by Vespa luctuosa are generally spherical during the early stages of their construction. After the nests have developed in size, they tend to take a more elongated, vertical orientation.
