= C8H16O3 =

The molecular formula C_{8}H_{16}O_{3} (molar mass: 160.21 g/mol, exact mass: 160.1099 u) may refer to:

- 2-Butoxyethanol acetate
- 2,2-Diethoxytetrahydrofuran
- 3-Hydroxyoctanoic acid
