= C11H16O4 =

The molecular formula C_{11}H_{16}O_{4} (molar mass: 212.24 g/mol) may refer to:

- 3,9-Diethylidene-2,4,8,10-tetraoxaspiro(5.5)undecane
- 3,9-Divinyl-2,4,8,10-tetraoxaspiro(5.5)undecane
- Methylenolactocin
