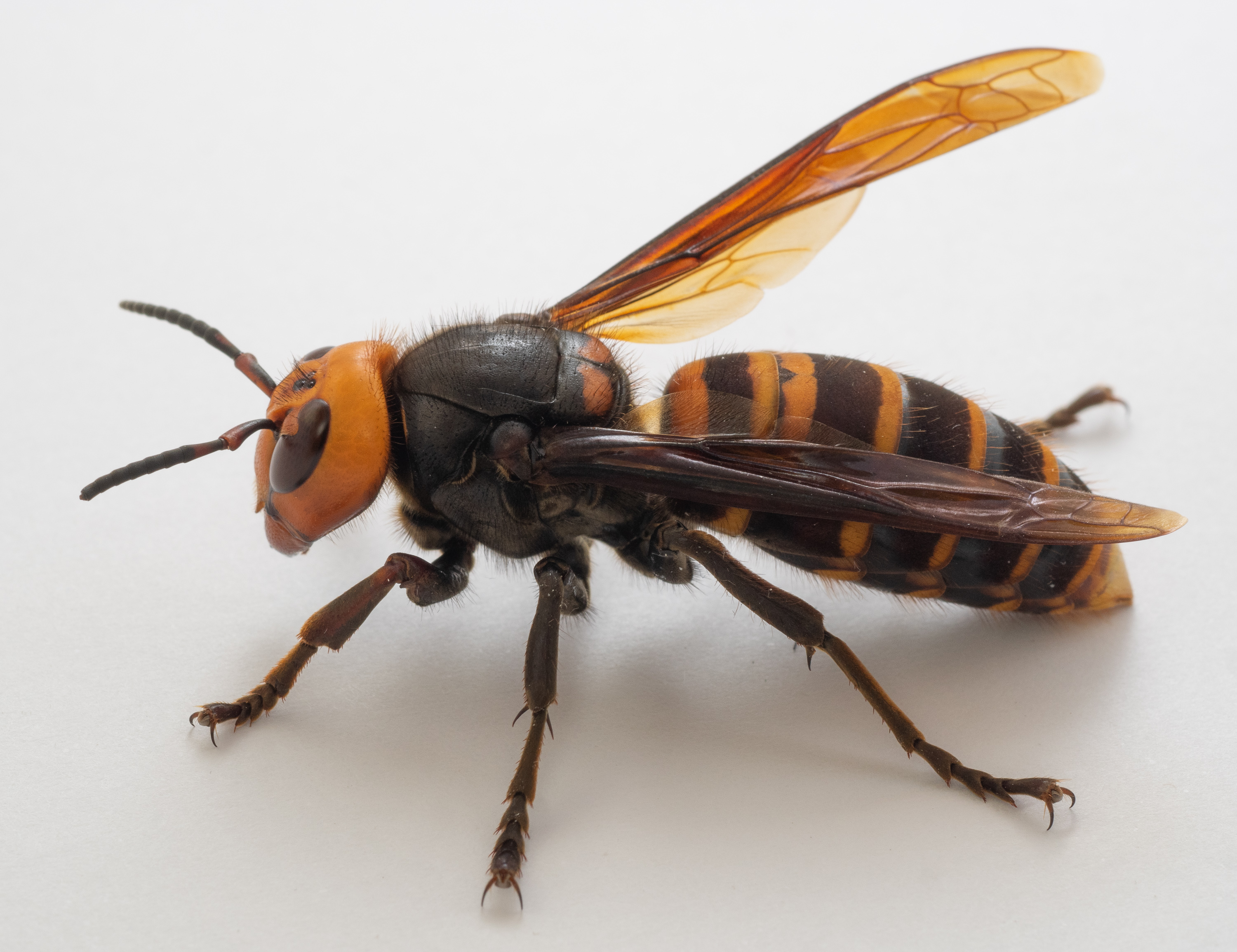

Scientific classification
- Kingdom: Animalia
- Phylum: Arthropoda
- Clade: Pancrustacea
- Class: Insecta
- Order: Hymenoptera
- Family: Vespidae
- Genus: Vespa
- Species: V. mandarinia

Binomial name
- Vespa mandarinia Smith, 1852

Synonyms
- Vespa magnifica Smith, 1852; Vespa japonica Radoszkowski, 1857; Vespa bellona Smith, 1871; Vespa magnifica var. latilineata Cameron, 1903; Vespa mandarina Dalla Torre, 1894 (misspelling); Vespa mandarinia nobilis Sonan, 1929; Vespa magnifica sonani Matsumura, 1930

= Asian giant hornet =

Asian giant hornet Temporal range: Miocene–present, 15.97–0 Ma

Predatory hornet, largest in the world

The Asian giant hornet (Vespa mandarinia), also known as the northern giant hornet, is the world's largest hornet. It is native to temperate and tropical East Asia, South Asia, mainland Southeast Asia, and parts of the Russian Far East. It was also briefly found in the Pacific Northwest of North America from late 2019 but was eradicated by December 2024.

Asian giant hornets prefer to live in low mountains and forests, while almost completely avoiding plains and high-altitude climates. They create nests by digging, co-opting pre-existing tunnels dug by rodents, or occupying spaces near rotten pine roots. (Note: p. 51–52, "The queens usually select underground cavities as nest sites. The cavities are either associated with rotten tree roots or are made by small vertebrates such as moles and snakes. The cavities are in well drained soil along a slope or under an overhanging cliff. The nests are found at a depth of six to 60 cm and the entrance tunnel is two to 60 cm long. A few nests are found above ground (e.g. nine nests from a sample of 56) either in tree hollows or mud walls and within one or two meties above the surface of the ground. The nests are found on hillsides, parks and forests but are rare in the lowlands and high mountains. The Taiwan colour form of V. mandarinia also nests underground but the western colour form has been found in tree hollows near the surface of the ground (Bingham, 1888)") The Asian giant hornet feeds primarily on larger insects, colonies of other eusocial insects, tree sap, and honey from honeybee colonies. It has a body length of 45 mm (1 3/4 in), a wingspan around 75 mm (3 in), and a stinger 6 mm (1/4 in) long, which injects a large amount of potent venom.

== Taxonomy and phylogeny ==
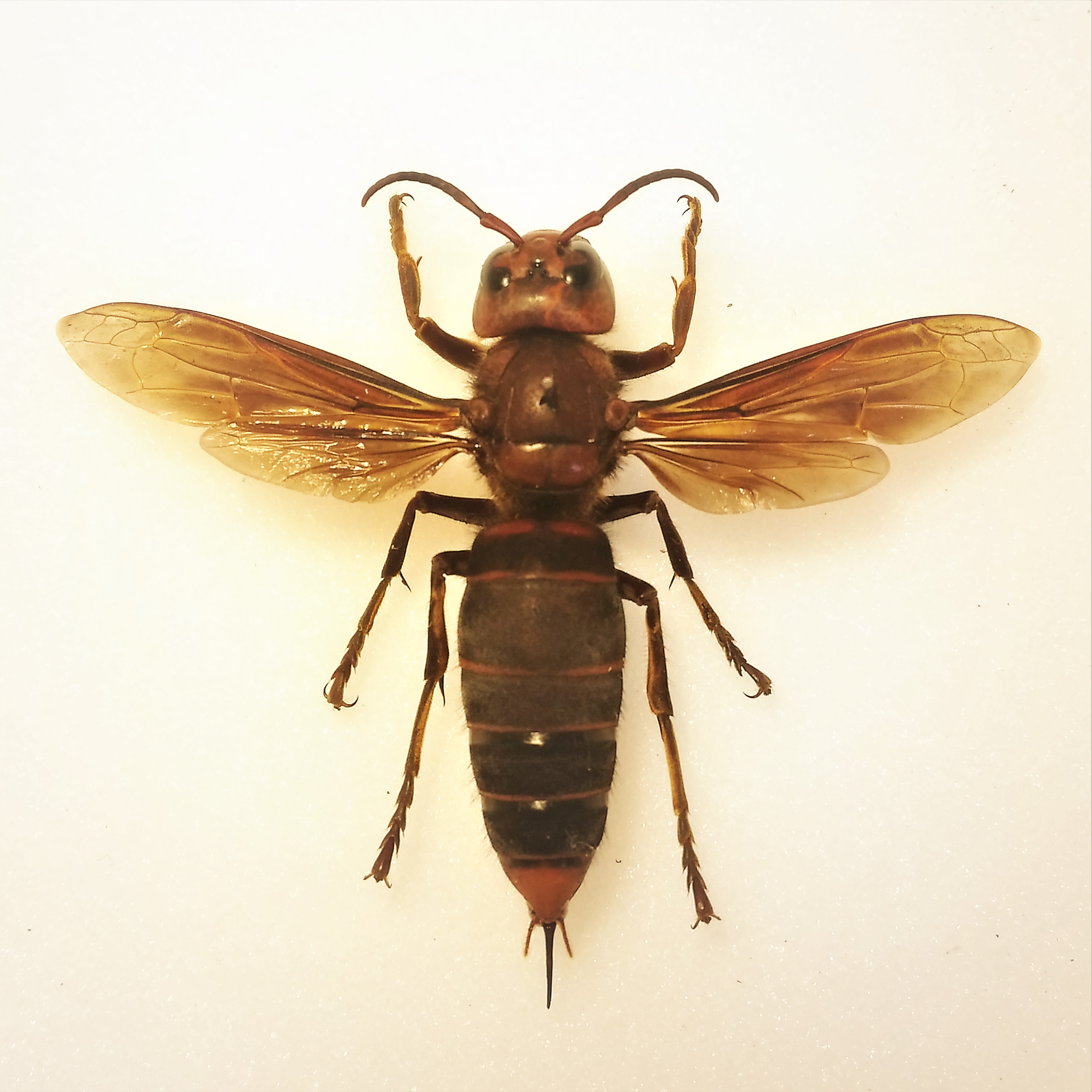
form "magnifica"

V. mandarinia is a species in the genus Vespa, which comprises all true hornets. Along with seven other species, V. mandarinia is a part of the V. tropica species group, defined by the single notch located on the apical margin of the seventh gastral sternum of the male. The most closely related species within the species group is V. soror. (Note: p. 48, "V. soror du Buysson 1905 was described as a variety of V. ducalis Smith, 1852, despite the structural characteristics of the vertex and apical margin of the clypeus being similar to V. magnifica. Van der Vecht (1957) recognised the confusion and proposed the new combination V. mandarinia soror. Archer (1991a) showed that V. mandarinia soror was sympatric for part of its geographical distribution with V. m. mandarinia but still retained its distinctive colour characteristics so should be given specific status, V. soror.") (Note: p. 48–49, "V. mandarinia and V. soror cannot be satisfactory separated by structural characteristics but are readily separated by colour characteristics: 1. Third to the sixth gastral terga in the female and to the seventh gastral terga in the male black, at most with a narrow apical orange band on the third gastral tergum .................................................................... soror du Buysson. 1905; — Third to the fifth gastral terga in the female and to the sixth gastral terga in the male with either a narrow or broad apical orange band, tergum six in the female and tergum seven in the male largely orange ................................... mandarinia Smith. 1852") The triangular shape of the apical margin of the clypeus of the female is diagnostic, the vertex of both species is enlarged, and the shape of the apex of the aedeagus is distinct and similar.

Division of the genus into subgenera has been attempted in the past, but has been abandoned, due to the anatomical similarity among species and because behavioral similarity is not associated with phylogeny. The species has existed since the Miocene epoch, as indicated by fossils found in the Shanwang Formation.

As of 2012, three subspecies were recognized: V. m. mandarinia, V. m. magnifica, and V. m. nobilis. The former subspecies referred to as V. m. japonica has not been considered valid since 1997. The most recent revision in 2020 eliminated all of the subspecies rankings entirely, with "japonica", "magnifica", and "nobilis" now relegated to informal non-taxonomic names for different color forms.

== Common names ==
After its discovery in North America, the scientific literature and official government sources referred to this species by its established common name, Asian giant hornet, whilst the mainstream media took to using the nickname "murder hornet". In July 2022, the Entomological Society of America stated that they will adopt the common name northern giant hornet for the species to avoid potentially discriminatory language, citing xenophobia and racism related to the COVID-19 pandemic.

== Description ==
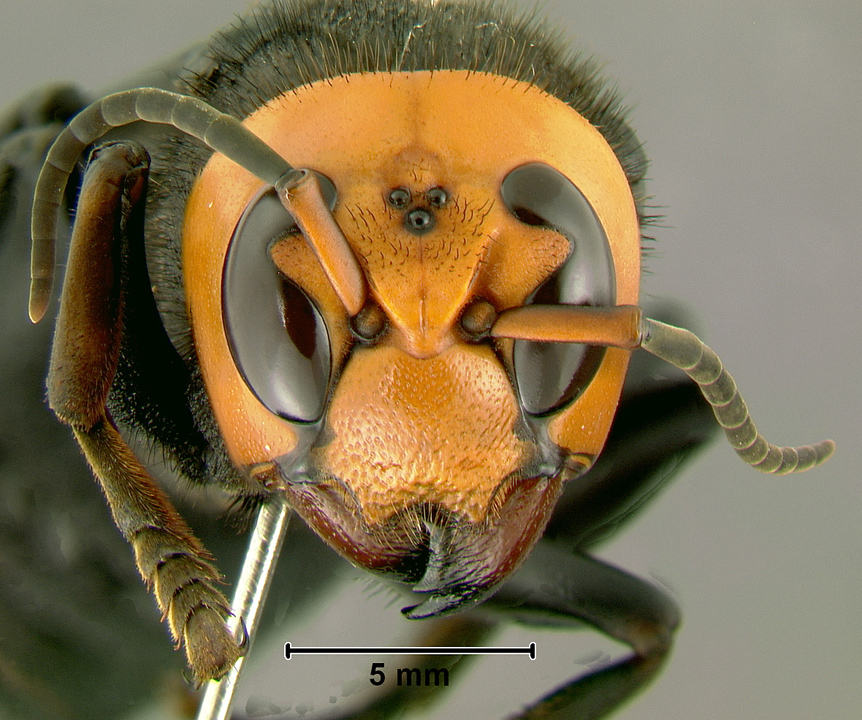

An Asian giant hornet takes flight in Kanagawa, Japan

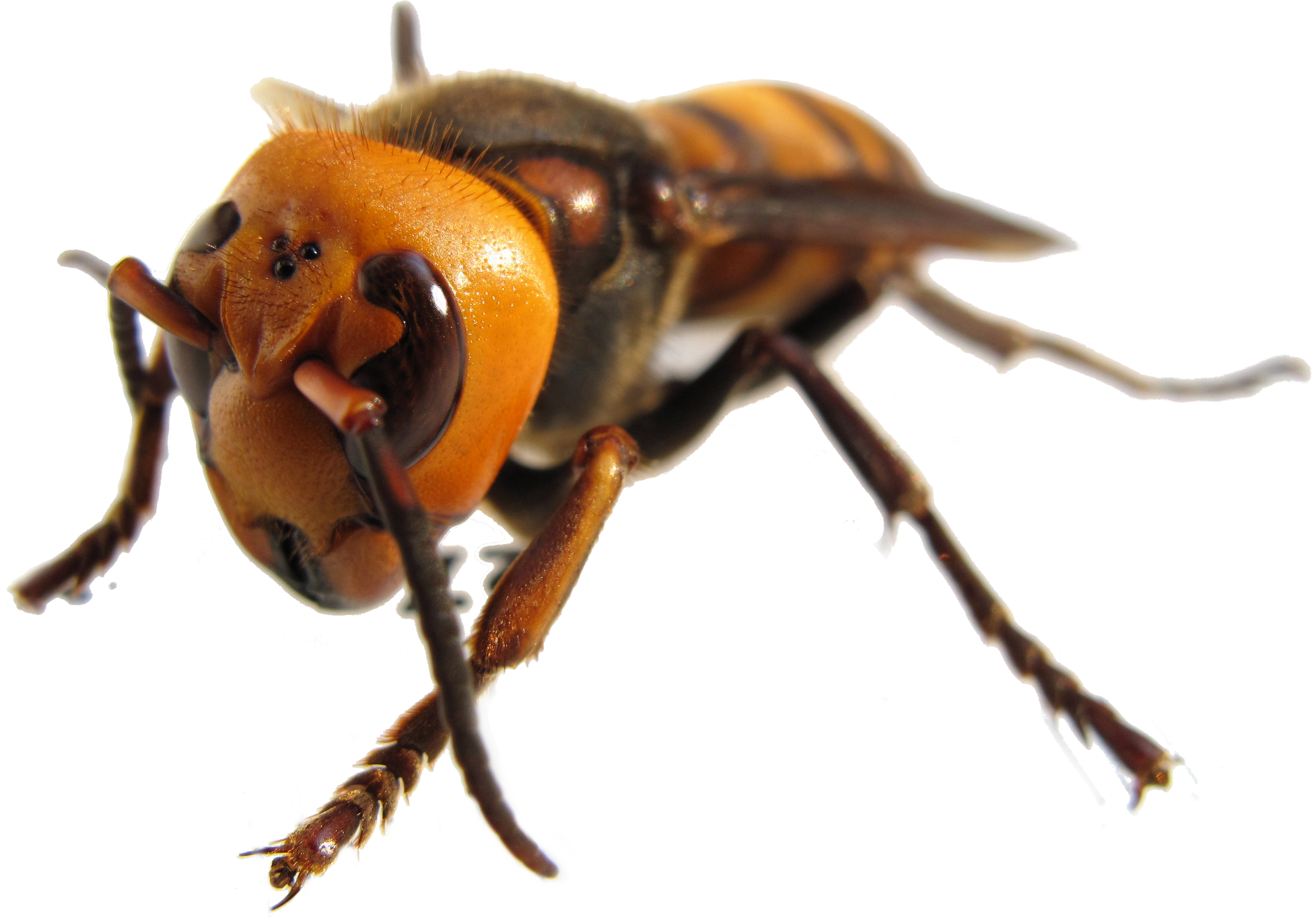
Another example of a Giant Asian Hornet

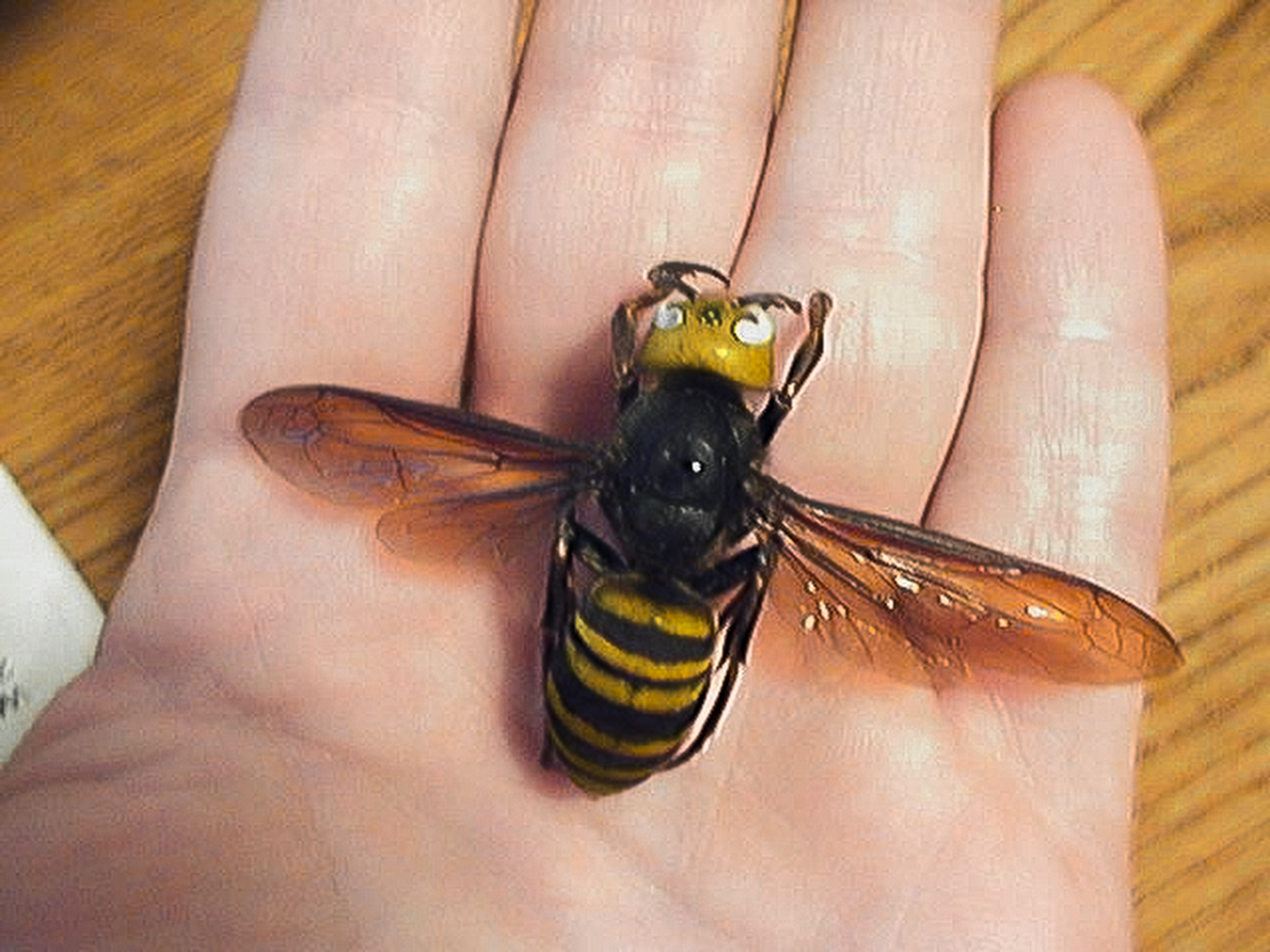

Regardless of sex, the hornet's head is a light shade of orange and its antennae are brown with a yellow-orange base. Its eyes and ocelli are dark brown to black. V. mandarinia is distinguished from other hornets by its pronounced clypeus and large genae. Its orange mandible contains a black tooth that it uses for digging. The thorax is dark brown, with two grey wings varying in span from 35 to 76 mm (1 3/8 to 3 in).

Its forelegs are brighter than the mid- and hindlegs. The base of the forelegs is darker than the rest. The abdomen alternates between bands of dark brown or black, and a yellow-orange hue (consistent with its head color). The sixth segment is yellow. Its stinger is typically 6 mm (1/4 in) long and delivers a potent venom that in cases of multiple hornets stinging simultaneously, or by rare allergic reaction, can kill a human.

=== Queens and workers ===
The queens are considerably larger than workers. Queens can exceed 50 mm (2 in), while workers are between 35 and 40 mm (1 2/5 and 1 3/5 in). The reproductive anatomy is consistent between the two, but workers do not reproduce.

=== Drones ===
Drones (males) are similar to females, and can attain 38 millimetres (1 1/2 in) in length, but lack stingers. This is a consistent feature among the Hymenoptera.

=== Larvae ===
Larvae spin a silk cocoon when they complete development and are ready to pupate. Larval silk proteins have a wide variety of potential applications due to their wide variety of potential morphologies, including the native fiber form, but also sponge, film, and gel.

=== Genome ===
The mitochondrial genome is provided by Chen et al., 2015. This information has also been important to confirm the place of the wider Vespidae family in the Vespoidea superfamily, and confirms that Vespoidea is monophyletic.

== Misidentifications ==
Within two days of the initial 2020 news report on V. mandarinia, insect identification centers in the Eastern United States (where the wasp has never occurred) began getting identification requests, and were swamped for the next several months, though not one of the thousands of submitted photos or samples was of V. mandarinia, but were instead primarily wasps such as the European hornet (V. crabro), the eastern cicada killer (Sphecius speciosus), or the southern yellowjacket (Vespula squamosa).

Submissions suspected by laypeople to be V. mandarinia also included other wasps of various sizes, bees, sawflies, horntails, wasp-mimicking flies, beetles, Jerusalem crickets, cicadas, and even a plastic children's toy that was wasp-like in appearance, all of which were routinely estimated to be 130–185% of their actual size.

Reports of this species from other parts of the world appear to be erroneous identifications of other introduced hornet species, such as V. orientalis in several locations around the world, and V. velutina in Europe.

== Distribution ==
=== Ecological distribution ===
V. mandarinia is primarily a forest dweller. When it does live in urban landscapes, it is highly associated with green space. (Note: • p. 2, "The abundance of V. mandarinia is positively associated with amounts of green spaces in urban landscapes, suggesting that the control of their populations should be focused on urban green areas.^{26}" • p. 6, "For canopy cover, a similar result was found by Azmy et al.^{26} in urban environments in China, where the quality of green areas benefited the abundance of V. mandarinia.") It is the most dependent upon green space of the Vespa species (with V. analis the least). Extremely urbanized areas provide a refuge for V. analis, whereas V. mandarinia – its predator – is entirely absent.

=== Geographic distribution ===
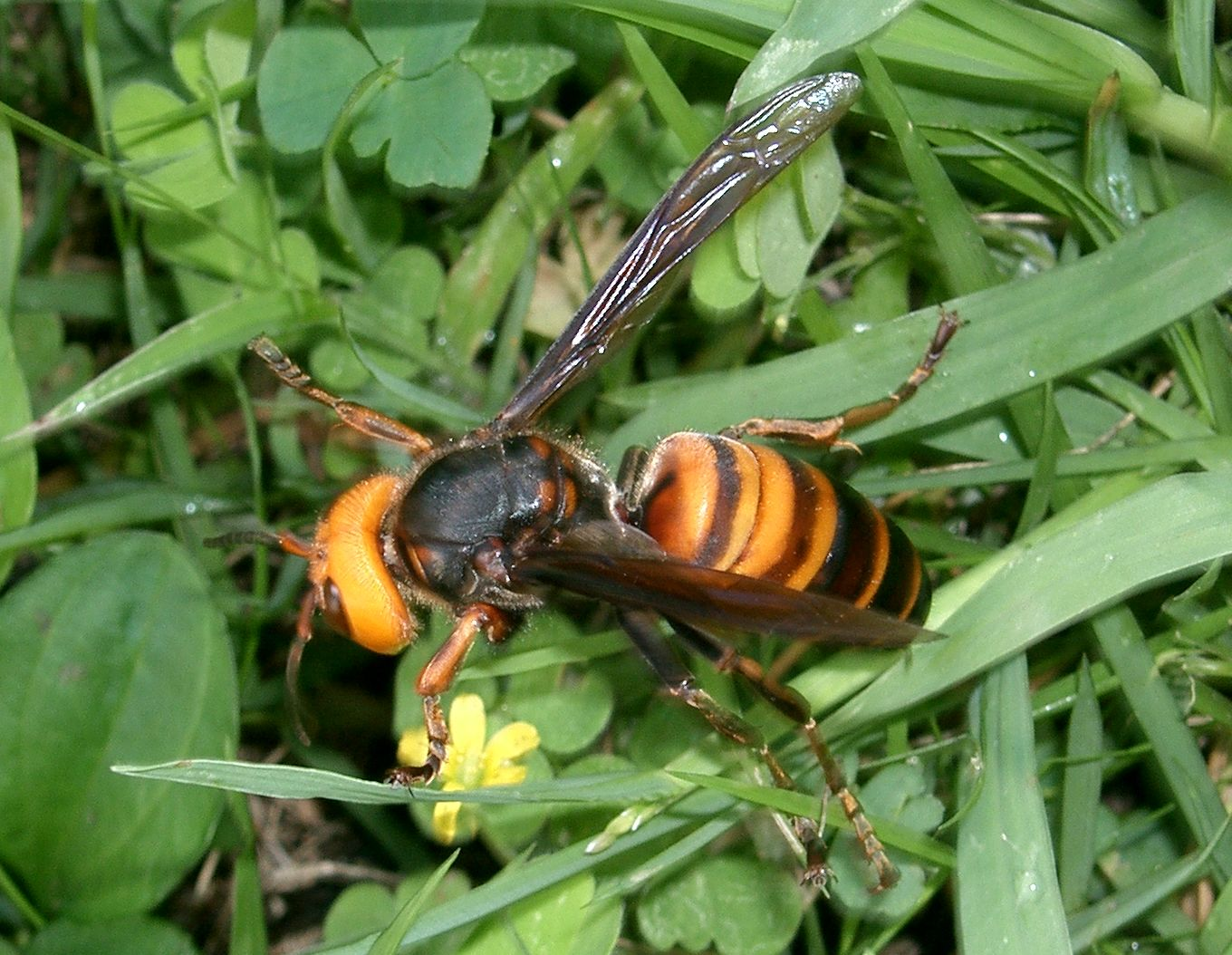

==== Asia ====
The Asian giant hornet can be found in:

- Russia – Primorsky Krai, Khabarovsk Krai (southern part only), and Jewish Autonomous Oblast region
- Korea (where it is called 장수말벌 (jangsumalbeol), "general giant wasp, general hornet")
- Mainland China
- Taiwan (traditional Chinese: 大虎頭蜂; simplified Chinese: 大虎头蜂; pinyin: dàhǔtóufēng; lit. 'giant tiger head bee')
- Laos
- Thailand
- Cambodia
- Myanmar
- Vietnam
- Nepal
- India
- Pakistan – Found in the Northern parts of the country like Hazara and the Pothohar Plateau
- Bhutan
- Brunei
- Sri Lanka
- Malaysia
- Japan – It is common in Japan. It prefers rural areas where it can find trees in which to nest, and is known as the ōsuzumebachi (オオスズメバチ(大雀蜂); literally, "giant sparrow bee, giant hornet"). At least as early as 2008, some popular and sensationalist media outlets in Japan also began referring to this wasp as satsujin suzumebachi (殺人スズメバチ; literally, "murderer sparrow hornet").

==== North America ====
The first confirmed sightings of the Asian giant hornet in North America were confirmed in 2019 and were mainly concentrated in the Vancouver area, with nests also discovered in neighboring Whatcom County, Washington, in the United States. The last confirmed sightings were in 2021.

- In August 2019, three hornets were found in Nanaimo on Vancouver Island, and a large nest was found and destroyed shortly thereafter.
- At the end of September, a worker was reported in Blaine, Washington.
- Another worker was found in Blaine in October.
- In December 2019, another worker was found in Blaine.
- Two specimens were collected in May 2020, one from Langley, British Columbia, about 13 kilometres (8 miles) north of Blaine, and one from Custer, Washington, 14 km (9 mi) southeast of Blaine.
- One queen sighting in June 2020 was from Bellingham, Washington, 24 km (15 mi) south of Custer.
- An unmated queen was trapped in July 2020, near Birch Bay, Washington, 10 km (6 mi) west of Custer.
- A male hornet was captured in Custer, Washington, in July 2020.
- A hornet of unknown caste was reported in August 2020, in Birch Bay, and another was trapped in the same area the following day.
- Three hornets were seen southeast of Blaine on 21 and 25 September 2020, and three more were found in the same area on 29 and 30 September, prompting officials to report that attempts were underway to pinpoint and destroy a nest believed to be in the area.
- In October 2020, the Washington State Department of Agriculture announced that a nest was found 2.5 metres (8.3 ft) above ground in a cavity of a tree in Blaine, with dozens of hornets entering and leaving. The nest was eradicated the next day, including the immediate discovery and removal of about 100 hornets. At first, the owner of the land required the nest to be returned, and he advertised it for sale. A local beekeeper bought it from him and gave it back to the state entomology team. Further analysis determined that the nest had contained about 500 live specimens, including about 200 queens. Some of these specimens were sent to the Smithsonian Institution to become a part of the NMNH Biorepository permanent cryogenic collection. It was announced that several undiscovered live nests were also believed to exist within Washington State, because the captures of individual hornets in Birch, Blaine, and Custer were all relatively far from the discovered nest. However, officials expressed cautious optimism, adding that eradicating the hornets before they became established in the area might still be possible. A Canadian official said that although individual specimens had been found in Canada and some nests were suspected to exist there, the hornets' presence seemed to be only in areas near the US-Canadian border, while the center of the invasion appeared to be in Washington.
- In November 2020, one individual was found in Abbotsford, BC. As a result the BC government asked Abbotsford beekeepers and residents to report any sightings.
- In November 2020, a queen was found in Aldergrove, BC.
- In August 2021, a nest was discovered in Whatcom County, Washington near Blaine, only 2 miles (3.2 km) from the nest WSDA eradicated in 2020. This nest was destroyed two weeks later on 25 August, before it could produce new queens.
- In September 2021, two more nests were found near Blaine, in the vicinity of the nest found in August, and a "potential sighting" was reported from near Everson, some 25 miles (40 km) east of Blaine.

A mitochondrial DNA analysis was performed to determine the maternal population(s) ancestral to the British Columbia and Washington introduced populations. (Note: p. 2, "Complete mitochondrial DNA was sequenced with Illumina’s MiSeq platform (ILLUMINA, United States).") The high dissimilarity between these two was similar to the mutual distances between each of the Chinese, Japanese, and Korean native populations (Note: p. 3, "These genetic differences corresponded to the values found between native V. mandarinia from Japan, South Korea, and China.") suggesting the specimens collected in 2019 were from two different maternal populations, (Note: p. 3-4, "A high pairwise distance of 0.0071 was also confirmed between the 13 PCGs of mitochondrial DNA sequences of V. mandarinia specimens from the United States and Canada, suggesting that the hornets differ in maternal origin (Table 1). ... The ML tree also revealed that V. mandarinia from the United States and Canada were not monophyletic (Fig. 2). Molecular phylogenetic analysis of the mitochondrial genomes revealed that V. mandarinia from the United States was genetically distant from that of Canada. ... The observed genetic differences between the Canada and U.S. mitochondrial genomes suggest that the two V. mandarinia specimens introduced to western N. America during or prior to 2019 are derived from different maternal lineages.") Japanese in BC (Note: p. 4, "The mitochondrial genome of ... the Canadian V. mandarinia was most genetically similar to the Japanese V. mandarinia used in this study.") and South Korean in Washington. (Note: p. 4, "The mitochondrial genome of the specimen collected from Blaine, WA shared 99.5% sequence homology to the specimen characterized from South Korea,") This suggests that two separate introductions of the Asian giant hornet occurred in North America within about 80 km (50 mi) of one another within a few months.

In April 2020, authorities in Washington asked members of the public to be alert and report any sightings of these hornets, which are expected to become active in April if they are in the area. If they become established, the hornets "could decimate bee populations in the United States and establish such a deep presence that all hope for eradication could be lost." A "full-scale hunt" for the species by the WSDA was then underway. Two assessment models of their potential to spread from their present location on the US–Canadian border suggested that they could spread northward into coastal British Columbia and Southeast Alaska, and southward as far as southern Oregon. (Note: • p. 4-6: Figure 2B, Figure 3A, Figure 3C, Figure 4 • Supplemental #2: Table S5) The USDA's Agricultural Research Service is engaged in lure/attractant development and molecular genetics research, both as part of its normal research mission, but also to further the near-term eradication goal in Washington.

In 2020, the United States Congress considered specific legislation to eradicate V. mandarinia including a proposal by the interior secretary, the Fish and Wildlife director, and the other relevant agencies, which has been introduced as an amendment to the appropriations omnibus. British Columbia Agriculture is prepared for a "long fight" lasting years, if necessary. One advantage humans will have is the lack of diversity of such an invasive population – leaving the hornets less prepared for novel environments and challenges.

In June 2021, a dead, desiccated male was found near Marysville, Snohomish County, Washington, and reported to WSDA. Its different, more reddish color form immediately suggested yet another parental population from the Japanese and Korean ones already known. The USDA Animal and Plant Health Inspection Service performed a genetic analysis several days later, and together with WSDA, confirmed it was of a third, unrelated population. The discovery of a male in June is "perplexing" given that the earliest male emergence in 2020 was July, which was already earlier than normal for the home range. This and its desiccated state indicate it did not emerge in 2021 at all, but is instead a dead specimen that had already emerged in a previous year.

The WSDA announced in December 2022 that "no confirmed sightings" of the hornet were reported in the state for that year, and in December 2023 stated no sightings occurred that year, and in December 2024, WSDA declared that the hornets had been eradicated from North America.

== Nesting ==
V. mandarinia nests in low mountain foothills and lowland forests. As a particularly dominant species, no efforts are directed toward conserving V. mandarinia or its habitats, as they are common in areas of low human disturbance. Unlike other species of Vespa, V. mandarinia almost exclusively inhabits subterranean nests, and aerial nesting is described as extremely rare.

In a study of 31 nests, 25 were found around rotten pine roots, and another study found only 9 of 56 nests above ground. Additionally, rodents, snakes, or other burrowing animals previously made some of the tunnels. The depth of these nests was between 6.0 and 60 cm (2 and 24 in). The entrance at the ground surface varies in length from 2.0 to 60 cm (1 to 24 in) either horizontally, inclined, or vertically. The queens that found the nest prefer narrow cavities.

Nests of V. mandarinia typically lack a developed envelope. During the initial stages of development, the envelope is in an inverted-bowl shape. (Note: p. 52, "The queen builds a comb of about 44 cells (range 37–60) with a mean cell building rate per day of 1.64 (range 0–4) and a mean egg laying rate per day of 1.53 (range 0–5). The envelope is bowl-shaped, not completely enclosing the comb which is ventrally exposed within the nest cavity. The queen is able to excavate soil so as to enlarge the nest cavity as the nest grows in size. The first workers emerge as adults after about 38 days from the queen nest. In southern Japan, nests at maturity consist of four to seven combs although five to six combs are more usual. Mature nests contain about 2700 cells with the largest nest having 4661 cells. The large cells are clearly larger than the small cells although the size of the small cells does increase during the development of the nest. The envelope is thin and absent at the bottom of the nest exposing the lower comb and providing access to the combs. The workers continue to excavate soil to enlarge the nest cavity although stones too large to be carried drop to the bottom of the nest cavity. The ability of the queen and workers to excavate soil probably relates to the lack of relocation behaviour in this species.") As the nest develops, one to three rough sheets of combs are created. Often, single primordial combs are created simultaneously and then fused into a single comb.

A system of one main pillar and secondary pillars connects the combs. Nests usually have four to seven combs. The top comb is abandoned after summer and left to rot. The largest comb is at the middle to bottom portion of the nest. The largest combs created by V. mandarinia measured 49.5 by 45.5 cm (19 1/2 by 18 in) with 1,192 cells (no obstacles, circular) and 61.0 by 48.0 cm (24 by 19 in) (elliptical; wrapped around a root system).

== Colony cycle ==
The nesting cycle of V. mandarinia is fairly consistent with that of other eusocial insects. Six phases occur in each cycle.

=== Prenesting period ===
Inseminated and uninseminated queens enter hibernation following a cycle. They first appear in early to mid-April and begin feeding on the sap of Quercus (oak) trees. Although this timing is consistent among hornets, V. mandarinia dominates the order, receiving preference for premium sap sources. Among the V. mandarinia queens is a dominance hierarchy. The top-ranked queen begins feeding, while the other queens form a circle around her. Once the top queen finishes, the second-highest-ranking queen feeds. This process repeats until the last queen feeds at a poor hour.

=== Solitary, cooperative, and polyethic periods ===
Inseminated queens start to search for nesting sites in late April. The uninseminated queens do not search for nests, since their ovaries never fully develop. They continue to feed, but then disappear in early July.

An inseminated queen begins to create relatively small cells in which she raises around 40 small workers. Workers do not begin to work outside of the hive until July. Queens participate in activities outside the hive until mid-July, when they stay inside the nest and allow workers to do extranidal activities. Early August marks a fully developed nest, containing three combs holding 500 cells and 100 workers. After mid-September, no more eggs are laid and the focus shifts to caring for larvae. The queens die in late October.

=== Dissolution and hibernating period ===
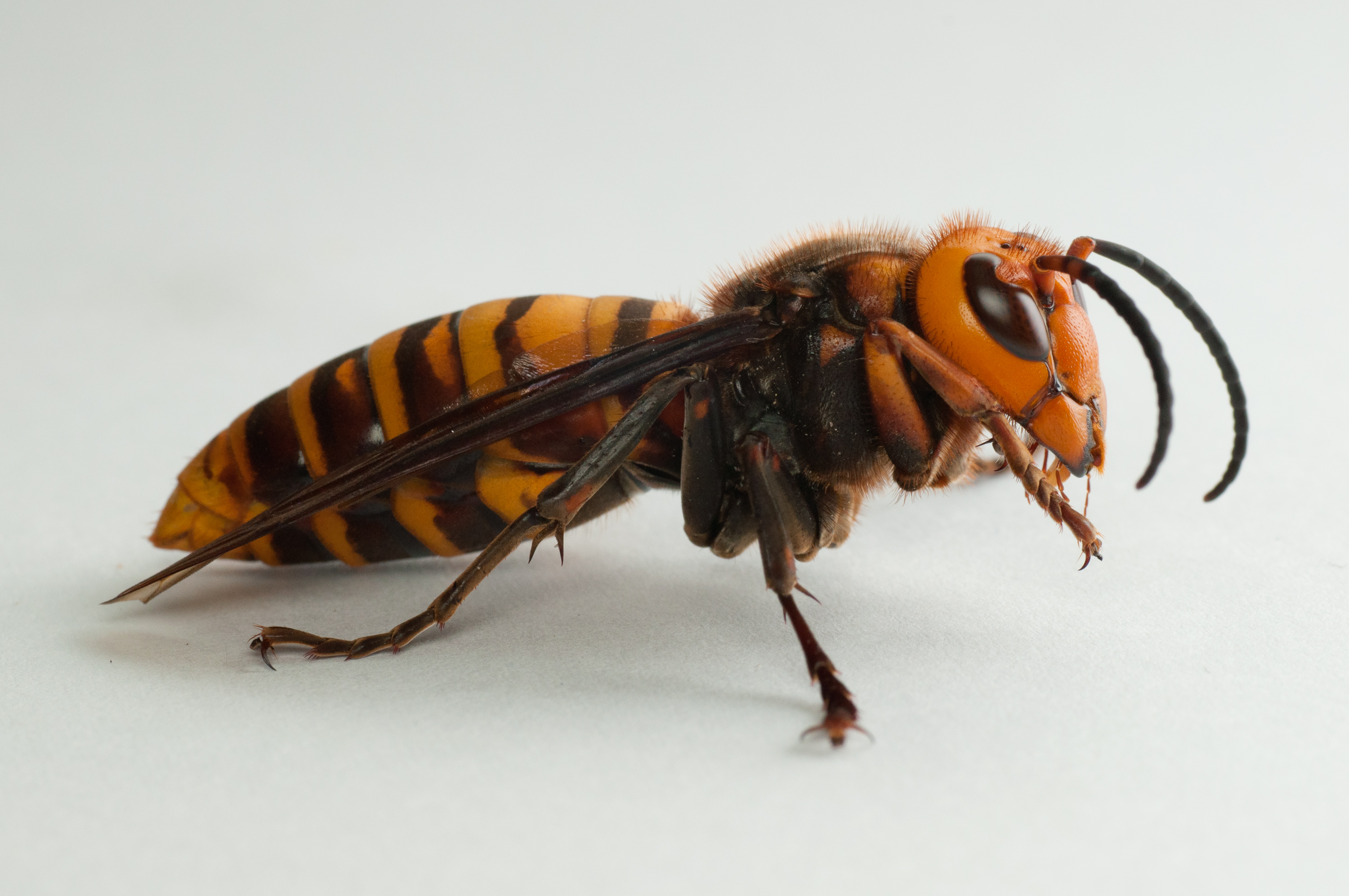
Male

Males and new queens take on their responsibilities in mid-September and mid-October, respectively. During this time, their body color becomes intense and the weights of the queens increase about 20%. Once the males and queens leave the nest, they do not return. In V. mandarinia, males wait outside the nest entrance until the queens emerge, when males intercept them in midair, bring them to the ground, and copulate from 8 to 45 seconds. After this episode, the males return to the entrance for a second chance, while the now-mated queens leave to hibernate. Many queens (up to 65%) attempt to fight off the males and leave unfertilized, at least temporarily. After this episode, prehibernating queens are found in moist, subterranean habitats.

When sexed individuals emerge, workers shift their focus from protein and animal foods to carbohydrates. The last sexed individuals to emerge may die of starvation.

== Sting ==
The stinger of the Asian giant hornet is about 6 mm (1/4 in) long. Their stinger injects an especially potent venom that contains mastoparan-M. Mastoparans are found in many bee and wasp venoms. They are cytolytic peptides that can damage tissue by stimulating phospholipase action, in addition to its own phospholipase. Masato Ono, an entomologist at Tamagawa University, described the sensation of being stung as feeling "like a hot nail being driven into my leg". Besides using their stingers to inject venom, Asian giant hornets are apparently able to spray venom into a person's eyes under certain circumstances, with one report in 2020 from Japan of long-term damage, though the exact extent of actual visual impairment still remains unassessed.

The venom contains a neurotoxin called mandaratoxin, (Note: p. 1693, "A hornet (Vespa mandarinia) neurotoxin, mandaratoxin (MDTX)") a single-chain polypeptide with a molecular weight around 20 kDa. (Note: p. 1696, "Estimations of the molecular weight of purified MDTX in its reduced and unreduced forms with denaturing solvents and its molecular weight in the native form are nearly the same. It is concluded that the toxin is a single polypeptide chain of approximately 20,000 daltons. Thus, the toxin acts on nerve membranes as a monomer protein of similar molecular weight.") While a single wasp cannot inject a lethal dose, multiple stings can be lethal even to people who are not allergic if the dose is sufficient, and allergy to the venom greatly increases the risk of death. Tests involving mice found that the venom falls short of being the most lethal of all wasp venoms, having an LD_{50} of 4.0 mg/kg. In comparison, the deadliest wasp venom (at least to laboratory mice) by weight belongs to V. luctuosa at 1.6 mg/kg. The danger of the V. mandarinia sting is therefore due to the relatively large amount of venom injected.

=== Immunogenicity ===
Evidence is insufficient to believe that prophylactic immunotherapy for the venom of other Vespidae will prevent allergic reaction to V. mandarinia venom, because of wide differences in venom chemistry.

=== Effects on humans ===
In 1957, Van der Vecht was under the impression humans in the native range lived in constant fear of V. mandarinia and Iwata reported in 1976 that research and removal were hampered by its attacks.

== Parasites ==
The strepsipteran Xenos moutoni is a common parasite among Vespa species. In a study of parasites among species of Vespa, 4.3% of V. mandarinia females were parasitized. Males were not stylopized (parasitization by stylopid strepsipterans, such as X. moutoni) at all. The major consequence of being parasitized is the inability to reproduce, and stylopized queens follow the same fate as uninseminated queens. They do not search for an area to create a new colony and feed on sap until early July, when they disappear. In other species of Vespa, males also have a chance of being stylopized. The consequences between the two sexes are similar, as neither sex is able to reproduce.

== Communication and perception ==
V. mandarinia uses both visual and chemical cues as a means of navigating itself and others to the desired location. Scent marking was discussed as a way for hornets to direct other members of the colony to a food source. Even with antennae damage, V. mandarinia was able to navigate itself. It was unable to find its destination only when vision impairment was induced. This implies that while chemical signaling is important, visual cues play an equally important role in guiding individuals. Other behaviors include the formation of a "royal court" consisting of workers that lick and bite the queen, thereby ingesting her pheromones.

These pheromones could directly communicate between the queen and her court or indirectly between her court and other workers due to the ingested pheromones. This is merely speculation, as no direct evidence has been collected to suggest the latter. V. mandarinia communicates acoustically, as well. When larvae are hungry, they scrape their mandibles against the walls of the cell. Furthermore, adult hornets click their mandibles as a warning to other creatures that encroach upon their territories.

== Scent marking ==
V. mandarinia is the only species of social wasp known to apply a scent to direct its colony to a food source. The hornet secretes the chemical from the sixth sternal gland, also known as Van der Vecht's gland. This behavior is observed during autumnal raids after the hornets begin hunting in groups instead of individually. The ability to apply scents may have arisen because the Asian giant hornet relies heavily on honey bee colonies as its main food source.

A single hornet is unable to take on an entire colony of honey bees because species such as Apis cerana have a well-organized defense mechanism. The honey bees swarm one wasp and vibrate their thoracic muscles to heat up the hornet and raise carbon dioxide to a lethal level. So, organized attacks are much more effective and easily devastate a colony of tens of thousands of honey bees.

== Interspecies dominance ==
In an experiment observing four different species of Vespa (V. ducalis, V. crabro, V. analis, and V. mandarinia), V. mandarinia was the dominant species. Multiple parameters were set to determine this. The first set parameter observed interaction-mediated departures, which are defined as scenarios wherein one species leaves its position due to the arrival of a more dominant individual. The proportion of interaction-mediated departures was the lowest for V. mandarinia. Another measured parameter was attempted patch entry. Over the observed time, conspecifics (interactions with the same species) resulted in refused entry far more than heterospecifics (interactions with different species).

Lastly, when feeding at sap flows, fights between these hornets, Pseudotorynorrhina japonica, Neope goschkevitschii, and Lethe sicelis were observed, and once more V. mandarinia was the most dominant species. In 57 separate fights, one loss was observed to Neope goschkevitschii, giving V. mandarinia a win rate of 98.3%. Based on interaction-mediated departures, attempted patch entry, and interspecific fights, V. mandarinia is the most dominant Vespa species.

== Diet ==
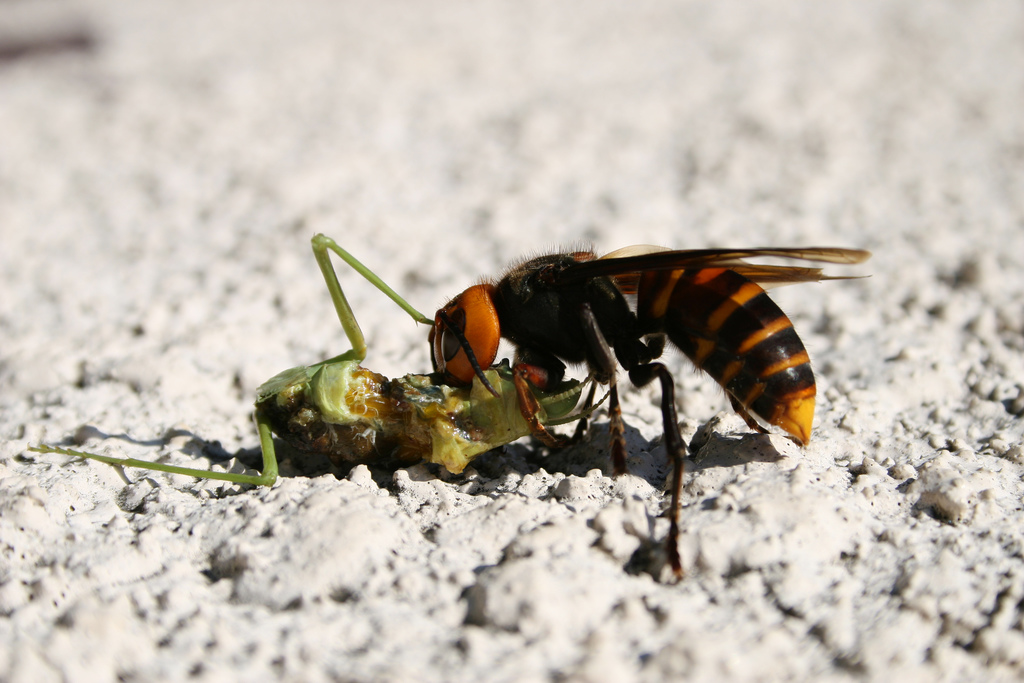
Feeding on a mantis

The Asian giant hornet is intensely predatory; it hunts medium- to large-sized insects, such as bees, other hornet and wasp species, beetles, hornworms, and mantises. The latter are favored targets in late summer and fall. Large insects such as mantises are key protein sources to feed queen and drone larvae. Workers forage to feed their larvae, and since their prey can include crop pests, the hornets are sometimes regarded as beneficial.

This hornet often attacks colonies of other Vespa species (V. simillima being the usual prey species), Vespula species, and honey bee (such as Apis cerana and A. mellifera) hives to obtain the adults, pupae, and larvae as food for their own larvae. Sometimes, they cannibalize each other's colonies. A single scout, sometimes two or three, cautiously approaches the hive, producing pheromones to lead its nest-mates to the hive. The hornets can devastate a colony of honey bees, especially if it is the introduced western honey bee. A single hornet can kill as many as 40 bees per minute due to its large mandibles, which can quickly strike and decapitate prey.

The honey bees' stings are ineffective because the hornets are five times their size and heavily armored. Only a few hornets (under 50) can exterminate a colony of tens of thousands of bees in a few hours. The hornets can fly up to 100 km (60 mi) in a single day, at speeds up to 40 km/h (25 mph). The smaller Asian hornet similarly preys on honey bees, and has been spreading throughout Europe.

Hornet larvae, but not adults, can digest solid protein. The adult hornets can only drink the juices of their victims, and they chew their prey into a paste to feed to their larvae. The workers dismember the bodies of their prey to return only the most nutrient-rich body parts, such as flight muscles, to the nest. Larvae of predatory social vespids generally, not just Vespa, secrete a clear liquid, sometimes referred to as Vespa amino acid mixture, the exact amino acid composition of which varies considerably from species to species, and which they produce to feed the adults on demand.

=== Native honey bees ===
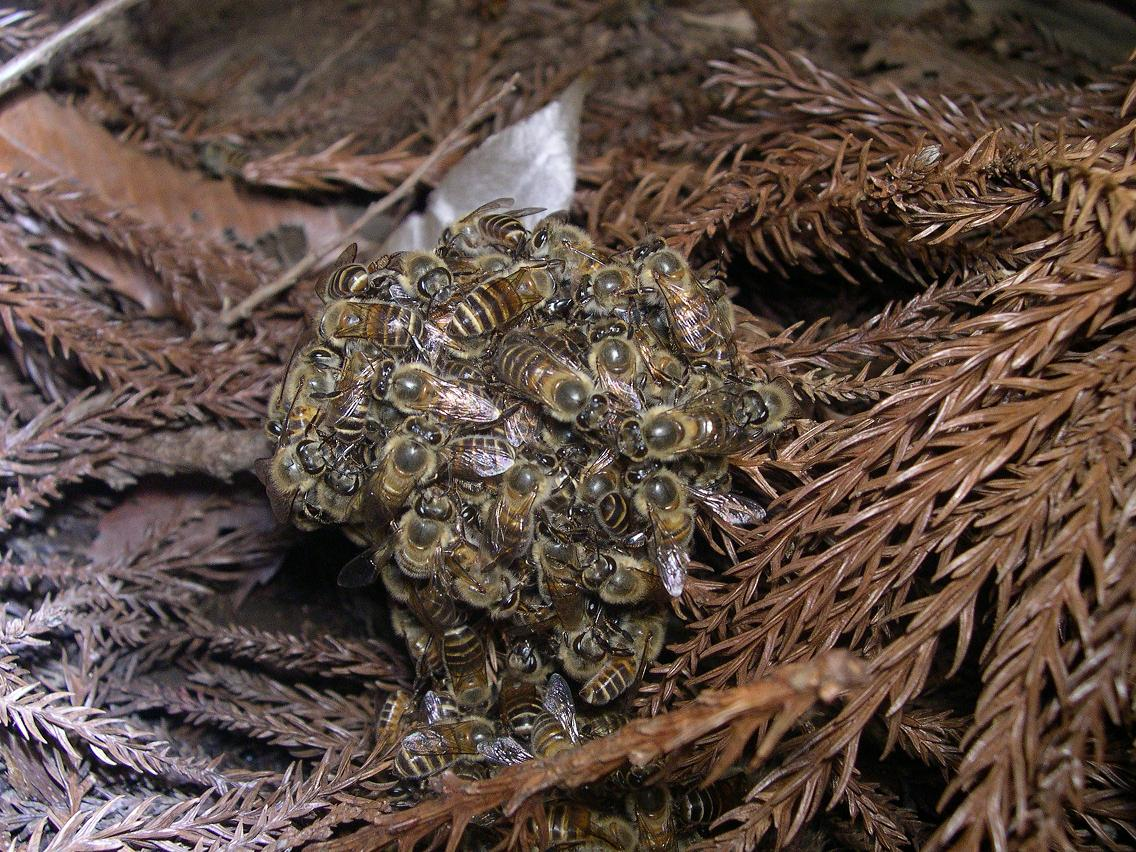
A defensive ball of Japanese honey bees (A. c. japonica) in which two Japanese hornets (V. simillima xanthoptera) are engulfed, incapacitated, heated, and eventually killed. This sort of defense is also used against the Asian giant hornet.

Beekeepers in Japan attempted to introduce western honey bees (Apis mellifera) because of their high productivity. Western honey bees have no innate defense against the hornets, which can rapidly destroy their colonies. Kakugo virus infection, though, may provide an extrinsic defence. Although a handful of Asian giant hornets can easily defeat the uncoordinated defenses of a western honey bee colony, the Japanese honey bee (Apis cerana japonica) has an effective strategy. When a hornet scout locates and approaches a Japanese honey bee hive, she emits specific pheromonal hunting signals. When the Japanese honey bees detect these pheromones, 100 or so gather near the entrance of the nest and set up a trap, keeping the entrance open.

This permits the hornet to enter the hive. As the hornet enters, a mob of hundreds of bees surrounds it in a ball, completely covering it and preventing it from reacting effectively. The bees violently vibrate their flight muscles in much the same way as they do to heat the hive in cold conditions. This raises the temperature in the ball to the critical temperature of 46 °C (115 °F).

In addition, the exertions of the honey bees raise the level of carbon dioxide (CO_{2}) in the ball. The bees can tolerate up to 50 °C (122 °F) even at that concentration of CO_{2}, but the hornet cannot survive the combination of high temperature and high carbon dioxide level. Some honey bees do die along with the intruder, much as happens when they attack other intruders with their stings, but by killing the hornet scout, they prevent it from summoning reinforcements that would wipe out the entire colony.

Detailed research suggests this account of the behavior of the honey bees and a few species of hornets is incomplete and that the honey bees and the predators are developing strategies to avoid expensive and mutually unprofitable conflict. Instead, when honey bees detect scouting hornets, they transmit an "I see you" signal that commonly warns off the predator.

=== Diet in North America ===
Based on an examination of larval waste products, the Washington State Department of Agriculture determined that the prey of V. mandarinia included cluster fly, orange legged drone fly, bristle fly, bronze birch borer beetle, western honey bee, western yellowjacket, German yellowjacket, aerial yellowjacket, bald faced hornet, European paper wasp, golden paper wasp, paddle-tailed darner dragonfly, shadow darner dragonfly, large yellow underwing moth, blinded sphinx moth, and red admiral butterfly (Vanessa atalanta). They had also eaten cow's meat, but the WSDA suggests that this may have been beef from a hamburger.

== Predators ==
The Asian giant hornet has very few natural predators. However, V. mandarinia nests are attacked by conspecific colonies, and crested honey buzzards may prey on this hornet. Besides the honey buzzard and each other, there are also instances of other insects such as mantises killing Asian giant hornets.

== Pollination capability ==
V. mandarinia is not solely carnivorous, but also a pollinator. It is among the diurnal pollinators of the obligate plant parasite Mitrastemon yamamotoi. It is among the most common pollinators of Musella lasiocarpa in the Yunnan Province of China.

== Extermination methods ==
=== Beating ===
Hornets are crushed with wooden sticks with flat heads. Hornets do not counterattack when they are in the bee-hunting phase or the hive-attack phase ("slaughter"), but they aggressively guard a beehive once they kill the defenders and occupy it. The biggest expenditure in this method is time, as the process is inefficient.

=== Nest removal ===
Applying poisons or fires at night is an effective way of exterminating a colony. The most difficult part about this tactic is finding the subterranean nests. The most common method of discovering nests is giving a piece of frog or fish meat attached to a cotton ball to a wasp and following it back to its nest. With V. mandarinia, this is particularly difficult considering its common home flight radius of 1–2 kilometres (0.62–1.24 mi). V. mandarinia travels up to 8 kilometres (5.0 mi) away from the nest.

For the rare nest that is up in a tree, wrapping the tree in plastic and vacuuming the hornets out is used.

=== Bait traps ===
Bait traps can be placed in apiaries. The system consists of multiple compartments that direct the hornet into a one-sided hole which is difficult to return through once it is in the cul-de-sac compartment, an area located at the top of the box from which honey bees can escape through a mesh opening, but wasps cannot due to their large size. Baits used to attract the hornets include a diluted millet jelly solution or a crude sugar solution with a mixture of intoxicants, vinegar, or fruit essence.

The WSDA has been using plastic bottle traps, baited with fruit juice and added alcohol. The alcohol is used because it repels bees, but not V. mandarinia, thus reducing the bycatch.

=== Mass poisoning ===
Hornets at the apiary are captured and fed a sugar solution or bee that has been poisoned with malathion. The toxin is expected to spread through trophallaxis. This method is good in principle, but has not been tested extensively.

=== Trapping at hive entrances ===
The trap is attached to the front of beehives. The effectiveness of the trap is determined by its ability to capture hornets while allowing honey bees to escape easily. The hornet enters the trap and catches a bee. When it tries to fly back through the entrance of the hive, it hits the front of the trap. The hornet flies upwards to escape and enters the capture chamber, where the hornets are left to die. Some hornets find a way to escape the trap through the front, so these traps can be very inefficient.

=== Protective screens ===
As explained in the trapping section, if met by resistance, hornets lose the urge to attack and instead retreat. Different measures of resistance include weeds, wire, or fishing nets or limiting the passage size so only honey bees can make it through. Experienced hornets catch on and eventually stay on these traps, awaiting the arrival of bees. The best method of controlling hornets is to combine protective screens with traps.

=== Glue traps ===
Some Japanese beekeepers place glue traps, similar to the ones commonly used against mice, atop the bees' artificial nesting box with a disarmed giant hornet stuck to the glue. The struggling hornet attracts more hornets who try to help and then get trapped on the glue sheet.

== Human consumption ==
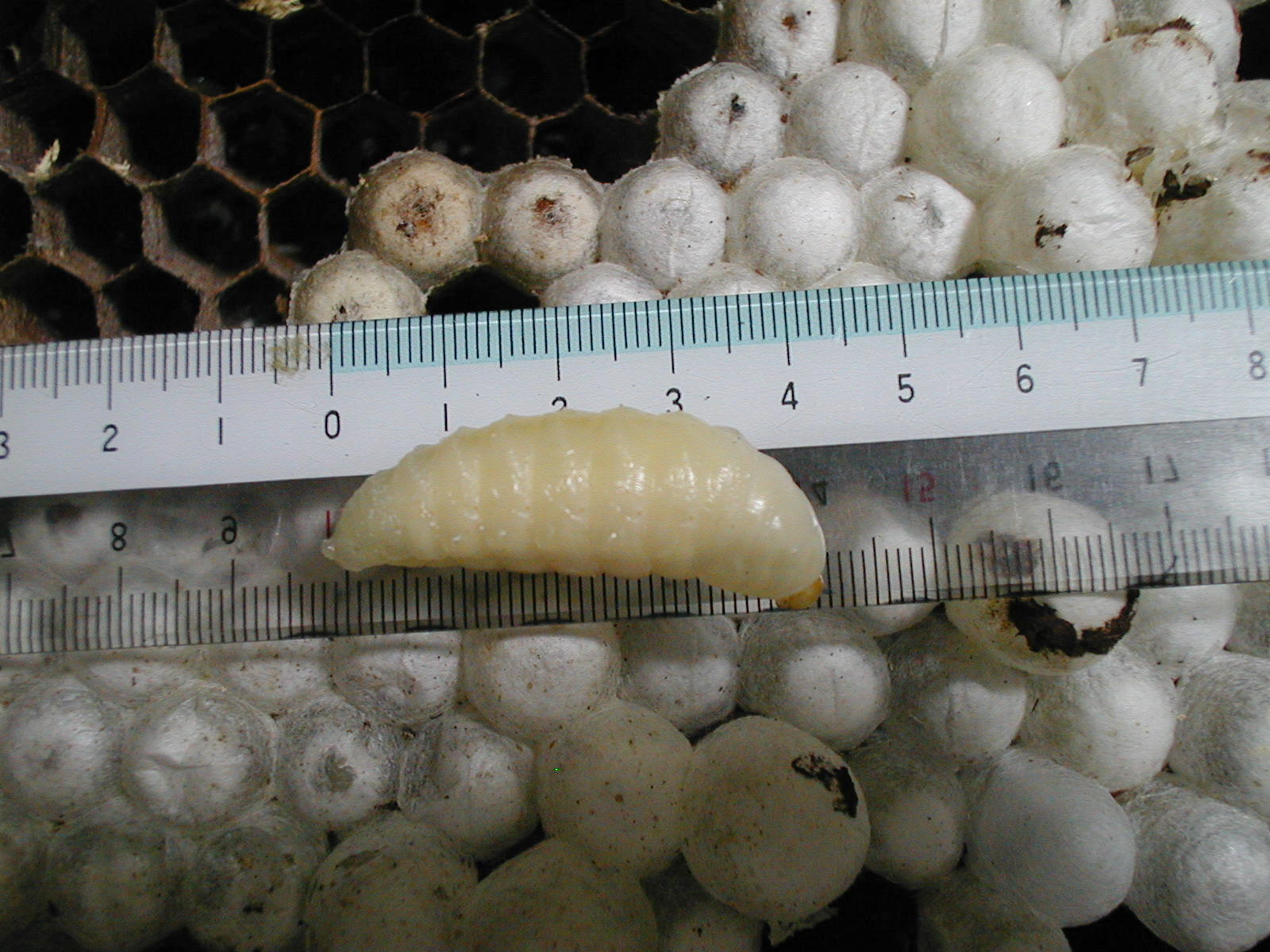
Hornet larva

In some Japanese mountain villages, the nests are excavated and the larvae are considered a delicacy when fried. In the central Chūbu region, these wasps are sometimes eaten as snacks or an ingredient in drinks. The grubs are often preserved in jars, pan-fried or steamed with rice to make a savory dish called hebo-gohan or hebo-meshi (へぼ飯). The adults are fried on skewers with the stinger still attached until the body becomes crunchy. Within this region, historically residents would hunt for wasp nests as a social activity, fostering the practice of wasp harvesting as well as establishing it as cultural heritage, celebrated in the Kushihara Hebo Matsuri, a festival celebrating wasp-based cuisine.

Asian giant hornets are also cultivated in Nagaland and Manipur, in eastern India.

== Potential economic impact of invasive spread ==
If V. mandarinia were to settle all suitable habitats in North America, potential control costs in the United States would be over US$113.7 million/year (possibly significantly higher). (Note: • p. 7, "Here we have estimated an annual projected loss of US$113.7 million per year. However, the costs associated with control actions not included in our study may eventually increase these amounts significantly (i.e. c. US$26 million as estimated by Barbet-Massin et al.^{12} for V. velutina).") Washington was the only state with confirmed sightings, and there were no confirmed sightings in Washington after 2021, and is now considered extirpated.

If V. mandarinia were to reach all suitable habitats in North America, bee products would bring in US$11.98 ± 0.64 million less per year, and bee-pollinated crops would produce US$101.8 million less per year. (Note: • p. 1, "If this species spread across the country, it could threaten 95 216 ± 5551 honey bee colonies, threatening an estimated income of US$ ... 101.8 million for ... bee-pollinated crops production ... while colonizing 60 837.8 km2 of bee-pollinated croplands." • p. 5, "The potential threatened income associated with bee-pollinated croplands reached US$101.8 million per year (Tables S7 and S8).") New York, Massachusetts, Pennsylvania, Connecticut, North Carolina, New Jersey, and Virginia would be most severely affected. (Note: • p. 4-7: Figure 2, §3.2 Threatened colonies, §3.3 Hive products potential losses, §3.4 Threatened bee-pollinated croplands, Figure 4, Figure 5 • Supplemental #2: Table S5, Table S6 (mislabeled S5), Table S7, Table S8, Table S9) By region, New England would be worst hit, and to a lesser degree the entire northeast and the entirety of eastern North America. New England would potentially become by far the greatest concentration of V. mandarinia in the world, far surpassing the original introduction site (the Pacific Northwest), and even its home range of East Asia. Alfalfa / other hays, apples, grapes, tobacco, cotton, and blueberries would be the crops most severely affected. (Note: • p. 5, "We also identified that alfalfa/hay, apples, grapes and tobacco are the crops with the largest threatened areas of 58 484.1, 522.9, 468.5 and 432.9 km2, respectively (Table S8)." • Supplemental #2: Table S3, Table S8, Table S9)

== See also ==
- List of largest insects

== Further information ==
- "How officials in Washington state are attempting to eradicate the 'Murder Hornet' before it spreads". PBS NewsHour. 12 December 2020.
- "Pest Alert: Asian Giant Hornet". American Bee Journal. 1 February 2020.
