= A. c. japonica =

A. c. japonica may refer to:

An abbreviation of a subspecies name. In binomial nomenclature the name of a subspecies is always the name of the genus to which the species belongs, followed by the species name (also called the species epithet), and the subspecies epithet. In A. c. japonica the genus name has been abbreviated to A. and the species epithet to c., and the subspecies epithet has been spelled out in full. In a document that uses this abbreviation it should always be clear from the context which genus and species names have been abbreviated.

Some of the most common uses of A. c. japonica are:

- Apis cerana japonica , a subspecies of honeybee native to Japan
- Aquila chrysaetos japonica, a subspecies of the golden eagle found in Japan and Korea

== See also ==
- Japonica (disambiguation)
