= 3,9-Divinyl-2,4,8,10-tetraoxaspiro(5.5)undecane =

3,9-Divinyl-2,4,8,10-tetraoxaspiro[5.5]undecane

Names
- Preferred IUPAC name 3,9-Diethenyl-2,4,8,10-tetraoxaspiro[5.5]undecane

Identifiers
CAS Number	78-19-3
3D model (JSmol)	Interactive image
ChemSpider	59603
ECHA InfoCard	100.000.994
EC Number	201-092-7
PubChem CID	66218
UNII	4H20E9P087
CompTox Dashboard (EPA)	DTXSID20871552
- InChI: InChI=1S/C11H16O4/c1-3-9-12-5-11(6-13-9)7-14-10(4-2)15-8-11/h3-4,9-10H,1-2,5-8H2 Key: OOXMQACSWCZQLX-UHFFFAOYSA-N
- SMILES: C=CC1OCC2(CO1)COC(OC2)C=C

Properties
Chemical formula	C_{11}H_{16}O_{4}
Molar mass	212.24 g·mol^{−1}
Appearance	crystalline solid
Melting point	43–46°C
- Except where otherwise noted, data are given for materials in their standard state (at 25 °C [77 °F], 100 kPa). Infobox references

3,9-Divinyl-2,4,8,10-tetraoxaspiro[5.5]undecane (DVTOSU) is a bicyclic organic molecule having a central quaternary carbon atom (a spiro atom) with which two alicyclic rings are linked, each comprising five atoms. DVTOSU is a diallyl acetal and the precursor for the isomeric ketene acetal monomer 3,9-diethylidene-2,4,8,10-tetraoxaspiro[5.5]undecane (DETOSU) which is a building block for polyorthoesters.

== Nomenclature ==
According to the nomenclature proposed by Adolf von Baeyer, the spiro compound is a spiro[5.5]undecane or, due to its four oxygen atoms, a 2,4,8,10-tetraoxaspiro[5.5]undecane which carries one allyl group in each of the 3 and 9 positions.

== Production ==
Condensation products from propenal and pentaerythritol were first described in 1950. The synthesis is carried using a general synthesis method for acetals at acid pH (pH 3–5) by reacting an alcohol with an excess of aldehyde, which is stabilized with hydroquinone in the case of propenal, which tends to polymerize at elevated temperature.

DVTOSU-Bildungsreaktion

After 19 hours of heating under reflux, neutralization of the oxalic acid, removal of excess aldehyde and the reaction water, the residue is fractionated under vacuum and diallylidene pentaerythritol is obtained in 87% yield. After recrystallization from 60% methanol, pure DVTOSU is obtained in 79% yield with a boiling point of 108-110 °C at 2 Torr and a melting point of 42-42 °C. The degree of conversion to acetal is determined by the equilibrium constant of the reaction:

GG-Reaktion zu Acetalen

The most common technique to complete the acetal formation is to remove the reaction water by azeotropic distillation with organic solvents that are not miscible with water, such as benzene or toluene. The tendency of propenal to polymerize at elevated temperatures is problematic, as well as its high volatility at elevated temperatures (which are, however, required to remove the reaction water). The low space-time yield of the acetal formation reaction requires long reaction times at elevated temperatures, at which the nucleophilic addition of water and alcohol to the double bond of the unsaturated aldehyde also leads to undesired by-products. The adaptation of the reaction conditions to these requirements enables the production of DVTOSU in 80% yield after 50 min reaction time at 80 °C reaction temperature and 20% excess aldehyde. The removal of the reaction water by azeotropic distillation with benzene (as carrier) shortens the reaction time to 10h, whereby after fractional distillation DVTOSU is obtained in 75% yield with a boiling point of 138-141 °C at 12 Torr. Cyclic acetals can also be produced from 1,3-diols with propenal under very gentle (room temperature) and continuous process conditions followed by continuous extraction with, for example, n-hexane in yields of up to 90%.

== Properties ==
3,9-Divinyl-2,4,8,10-tetraoxaspiro[5.5]undecane is without impurity a white crystalline powder. However, DVTOSU is often sold as a liquid, due to its low crystallization tendency. The highly variable data on yields and boiling points during the first fractionated distillation indicate by-products, e.g. by rearrangement of the double bonds or nucleophilic addition. The production of pure DVTOSU as a solid requires repeated recrystallization from hydrocarbons such as pentane or n-hexane or aqueous methanol.

== Use ==
Alcohols, such as methanol, and acids, such as ethanoic acid, can be added in a nucleophilic addition reaction to the allylic double bonds of 3,9-divinyl-2,4,8,10-tetraoxaspiro[5.5]undecane to the corresponding 3,9-dimethoxyethyl- or 3,9-diacetoxyethyl-2,4,8,10-tetraoxaspiro[5.5]undecane. Similarly, hydrogen chloride can be added in 80% yield or hydrogen cyanide in 50% yield to the corresponding 3,9-bis(2-chloroethyl)- or 3,9-bis(2-cyanoethyl)-2,4,8,10-tetraoxaspiro[5.5]undecane. In the presence of strong acids, such as boron trifluoride diethyl etherate, 3,9-divinyl-2,4,8,10-tetraoxaspiro[5.5]undecane reacts with diols or diacids to form rubber-like polymers which can be crosslinked to hard resins by further acid addition and elevated temperatures. According to the authors, the terminal C atoms of the allyl groups of DVTOSU are linked to the di- or polyol via ether bonds. The diallylacetal 3,9-divinyl-2,4,8,10-tetraoxaspiro[5.5]undecane, DVTOSU, is the starting compound for the ketene diacetal 3,9-diethylidene-2,4,8,10-tetraoxaspiro[5.5]undecane, DETOSU, which is formed by shifting the double bonds from the allyl to the vinyl position.

DETOSU-Bildungsreaktion

DETOSU, in turn, is of important as a reactive monomer for the formation of polyorthoesters.
