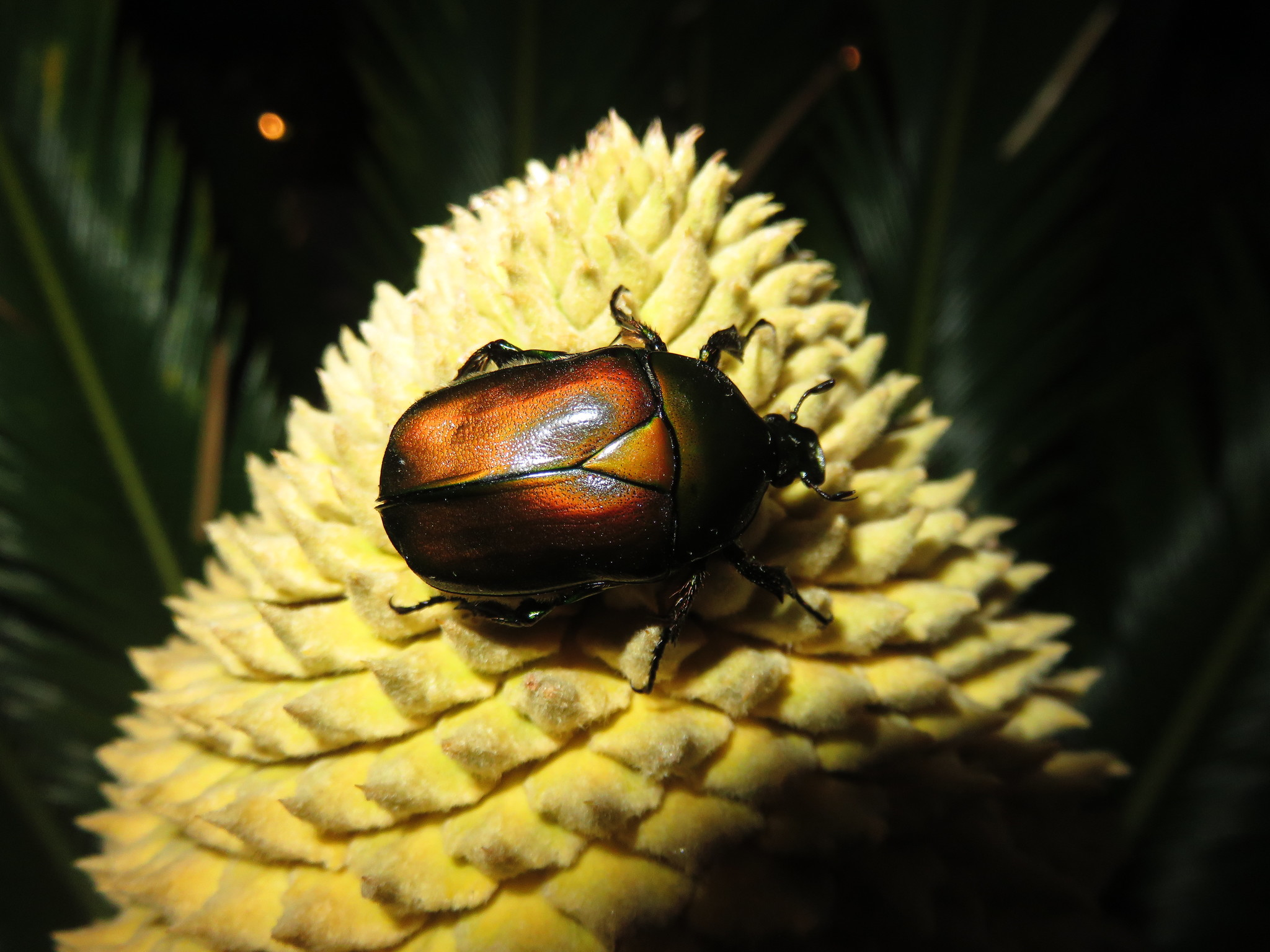
- Pseudotorynorrhina japonica, ??

Scientific classification
- Kingdom: Animalia
- Phylum: Arthropoda
- Class: Insecta
- Order: Coleoptera
- Suborder: Polyphaga
- Infraorder: Scarabaeiformia
- Family: Scarabaeidae
- Subfamily: Cetoniinae
- Tribe: Goliathini
- Subtribe: Coryphocerina
- Genus: Pseudotorynorrhina; Miksic, 1967

= Pseudotorynorrhina =

Genus of beetles

Pseudotorynorrhina is a genus of fruit and flower chafers in the beetle family Scarabaeidae.

== Species ==
These four species belong to the genus Pseudotorynorrhina:

- Pseudotorynorrhina fortunei (Saunders, 1852)
- Pseudotorynorrhina hosoguchii Krajčik, 2007
- Pseudotorynorrhina japonica (Hope, 1841)
- Pseudotorynorrhina tonkiniana (Ruter, 1965)
