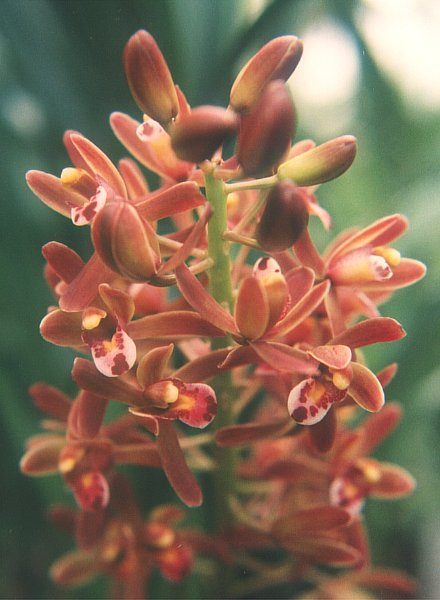

Scientific classification
- Kingdom: Plantae
- Clade: Tracheophytes
- Clade: Angiosperms
- Clade: Monocots
- Order: Asparagales
- Family: Orchidaceae
- Subfamily: Epidendroideae
- Genus: Cymbidium
- Species: C. floribundum

Binomial name
- Cymbidium floribundum Lindl. (1833)

Synonyms
- Cymbidium pumilum Rolfe (1907); Cymbidium pumilum f. virescens Makino (1912); Cymbidium illiberale Hayata (1914); Cymbidium floribundum var. pumilum (Rolfe) Y.S. Wu & S.C. Chen (1980)

= Cymbidium floribundum =

Species of orchid

Cymbidium floribundum, the yellow margin orchid, golden leaf-edge orchid or golden-edged orchid, is a species of orchid.

3-Hydroxyoctanoic acid is a signalling chemical emitted by C. floribundum and recognized by Japanese honeybees (Apis cerana japonica).
