= 1,2,6-Hexanetriol =

Names
- Preferred IUPAC name Hexane-1,2,6-triol

Identifiers
CAS Number	106-69-4
3D model (JSmol)	Interactive image
ChEMBL	ChEMBL3184716
ChemSpider	7535
ECHA InfoCard	100.003.114
EC Number	203-424-6
KEGG	C20334
PubChem CID	7823
UNII	W45XXM0XWE
CompTox Dashboard (EPA)	DTXSID0041224
- InChI: InChI=1S/C6H14O3/c7-4-2-1-3-6(9)5-8/h6-9H,1-5H2 Key: ZWVMLYRJXORSEP-UHFFFAOYSA-N
- SMILES: C(CCO)CC(CO)O

Properties
Chemical formula	C_{6}H_{14}O_{3}
Molar mass	134.175 g·mol^{−1}
- Except where otherwise noted, data are given for materials in their standard state (at 25 °C [77 °F], 100 kPa). Infobox references

1,2,6-Hexanetriol is a trivalent alcohol with two primary and one secondary hydroxy group. It is similar to glycerol in many respects and is used as a substitute for glycerol in many applications due to its more advantageous properties, such as higher thermal stability and lower hygroscopicity.

== Production ==
Racemic 1,2,6-hexanetriol is obtained by catalytic hydrogenation of 2-hydroxyadipaldehyde (2-hydroxyhexane-1,6-dial) which is in turn produced by the acid hydrolysis of acrolein dimer (3,4-dihydro-2-formyl-2H-pyran) in dilute aqueous solution.

Despite high product yields, a lightly colored product is obtained on this direct route and the hydrogenation catalyst is rapidly poisoned under the high aldehyde concentrations. For industrial production, it is therefore suitable to carry out the reaction in acidic alcoholic solutions, whereby the solvent alcohol quickly adds to the activated double bond to form 2-formyl-6-alkoxytetrahydropyran (THP) and then reacts with the formyl group to form the corresponding hemiacetal. Water is added to the reaction mixture to hydrolyse the acetal groups and Raney nickel is added as a hydrogenation catalyst. The hydrogenation under 20 atm hydrogen at 140 °C is completed after approx. 1.5 h and, after work-up, yields pure 1,2,6-hexanetriol in a yield >95 %.

Recently, several authors have described the synthesis of 1,2,6-hexanetriol from the easily accessible platform chemical hydroxymethylfurfural (HMF), which can be produced from "carbon neutral" (i.e. renewable) raw materials such as pentoses, hexoses, and other carbohydrates. In the first hydrogenation step from HMF to tetrahydrofuran-dimethanol, Raney nickel again shows the highest catalyst activity. Further hydrogenation, even with expensive rhodium-rhenium catalysts, leads only to modest selectivities and unsatisfactory yields.

== Properties ==
1,2,6-Hexanetriol is a clear, odourless, viscous, high-boiling and hygroscopic liquid, which is miscible with water and polar organic solvents but immiscible with non-polar solvents such as benzene, diethyl ether or heptane. The compound is similar in its properties to the simplest triol glycerol, but it is much more viscous at lower density and only about half as hygroscopic as glycerol. Because of its lower polarity and higher molecular volume, 1,2,6-hexanetriol often forms more stable mixtures or emulsions, especially with non-polar components, and is therefore also a useful plasticizer.

== Use ==
1,2,6-Hexanetriol is used as a solvent, for raising the viscosity of liquid and semi-solid cosmetic and pharmaceutical preparations due to its low toxicity and good compatibility, and as a humectant due to its hygroscopicity. 1,2,6-hexanetriol improves the effectiveness of the active ingredients as an adjuvant in crop protection formulations. In inks and paints it stabilizes the dispersion of pigments. Derivatives of 1,2,6-hexanetriol are also used in hydraulic fluids and as corrosion inhibitors. As a trifunctional molecule, 1,2,6-hexanetriol acts as a polyol in polyurethanes and as a crosslinker in polyesters and alkyd resins. Esters of 1,2,6-hexanetriol with longer-chain carboxylic acids are useful plasticizers for PVC and cellulose acetate, as well as for rubber polymers such as nitrile rubber (NBR) and neoprene., 1,2,6-hexanetriol is used as a monomer for the synthesis of POE III type polyorthoesters, which are characterized by an ointment-like consistency due to the high flexibility of the triol and have been tested as active ingredient depot materials for ophthalmic applications.
