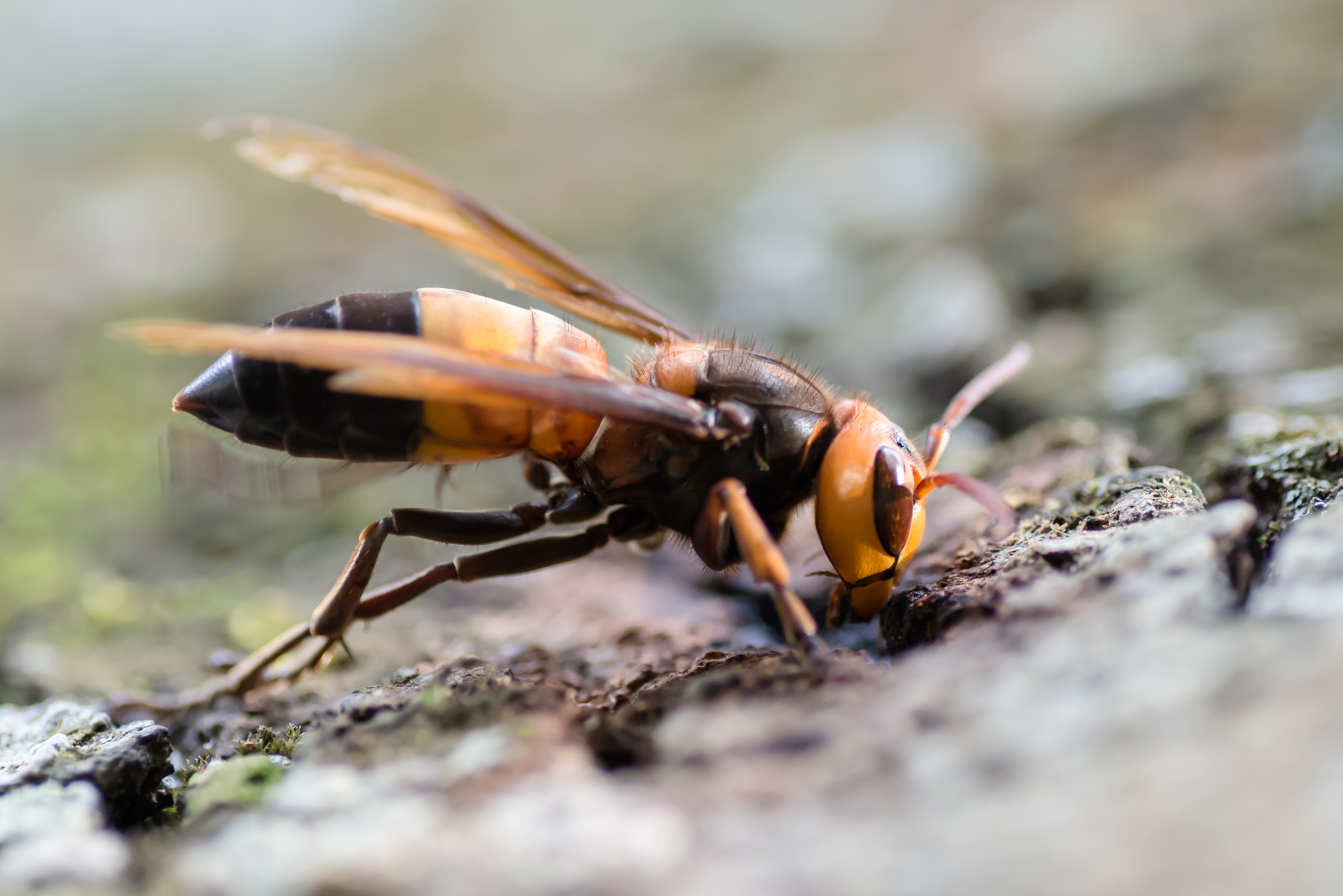

Scientific classification
- Kingdom: Animalia
- Phylum: Arthropoda
- Clade: Pancrustacea
- Class: Insecta
- Order: Hymenoptera
- Family: Vespidae
- Genus: Vespa
- Species: V. soror

Binomial name
- Vespa soror Buysson, 1905

Synonyms
- Vespa ducalis var. soror du Buysson, 1905; Vespa mandarina [sic] soror van der Vecht, 1957

= Vespa soror =

Species of hornet

Vespa soror, also known as the southern giant hornet, is a species of hornet present in India, Northern Thailand, Laos, Northern Vietnam, and parts of South China, including Hong Kong, Guangdong, Fujian, and Hainan Island.

V. soror is one of the largest hornets, though smaller than the Asian giant hornet (V. mandarinia). The body lengths of the workers range from 26–35 mm, and those of queens range from 39–46 mm. Their nests are typically subterranean and found in forested areas.

They are aggressive predators and have been observed to attack the nests of honeybees, wasps, and smaller hornet species. They also prey on mantids, dragonflies, butterflies, grasshoppers, and small vertebrates such as geckos.

== Predation on honeybees ==
V. soror frequently attack bee colonies in groups, landing at and chewing on entrances, mass slaughtering adult defenders, and carrying away the carcasses and brood, which can destroy a colony. They exhibit behavior of rubbing their gasters on the hive and nearby vegetation during predation, and this may be a recruitment signal to attract other V. soror workers to attack. A defensive technique of Apis cerana bees that has been found to be widespread in Vietnam and reported in China, Thailand, Bhutan, and Nepal is to attach spots of animal faeces of about 2mm diameter around the entrance to hives. This is the first time that honeybees have been reported to use tools, or non-plant substances, though both of these have been reported for other related bees (e.g.,). The bees only spotted their hives after visits from predatory hornets. Hornets were observed to spend less than half the time at nest entrances if they were spotted, and 94% less time trying to chew their way in. The reason for the effectiveness is not known.

== Distribution ==
=== Introduced ===
V. soror is not believed to have any established introduced populations - including in North America, where congener V. mandarinia is introduced. However one queen was found at Vancouver Harbor, British Columbia, Canada in May 2019. This is believed to be associated with the port and not a wider population in North America.

In 2022-2023, researchers found four V. soror workers in El Campu, northern Spain. Spain thus became the second area invaded by V. soror.

== See also ==
- Asian hornet
- Asian giant hornet
