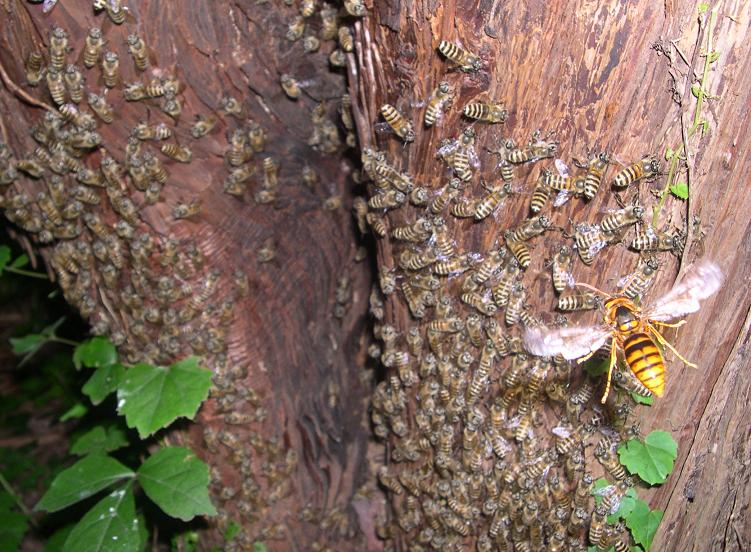
- A hive with workers of A. c. japonica being scouted by a yellow hornet (Vespa simillima).

Scientific classification
- Kingdom: Animalia
- Phylum: Arthropoda
- Class: Insecta
- Order: Hymenoptera
- Family: Apidae
- Genus: Apis
- Species: A. cerana
- Subspecies: A. c. japonica

Trinomial name
- Apis cerana japonica (Radoszkowski, 1877)

= Apis cerana japonica =

Japanese honeybee

Subspecies of bee

Apis cerana japonica is a subspecies of the eastern honeybee in Japan. It is commonly known as the Japanese honeybee (Japanese: ニホンミツバチ, Hepburn: Nihon mitsubachi).

Traditionally, it has been believed that the ancestors of Japanese honeybees naturally migrated from the Korean Peninsula to Japan via Tsushima Island, and genetic differentiation between Japanese honeybees and Korean honeybees occurred about 20,000 years ago, which coincides with the separation of Japan's Tsushima Island from the Korean Peninsula due to sea level rise. However, the above natural distribution theory has been criticized for several issues, including problems with the application of the molecular clock hypothesis, the fact that even during the coldest period of the Last Glacial Maximum, the Korean Peninsula and Tsushima Island were not connected by a land bridge, and the inability to reasonably explain why the southward migration of honeybee would have stopped at Tsushima if such a land bridge had existed. Currently, based on careful investigation and analysis of ancient documents and records, the theory of artificial introduction is widely accepted, suggesting that the ancestors of Japanese honeybees were brought from the Korean Peninsula during the Imjin War by Oroshi Magojiro of Kii Province and Shimazu Yoshihiro of Satsuma Province and Ōsumi Province, along with Korean beekeeping technicians. Excluding the Nihon Shoki, it has been clarified that the creatures referred to as "honeybee" in documents prior to Imjin War were bumblebee or carpenter bee. Furthermore, the absence of any descriptions of honeybee, along with the fact that there is no word in the old Japanese meaning "honey," suggests that honeybee was not originally distributed in Japan. They have been observed moving into urban areas in the absence of natural predators.

A. c. japonica is very resistant to the mite Varroa jacobsoni, which is commonly found among A. cerana. It is also able to adapt to weather extremes, has a long flight duration and is less likely to sting than the western counterpart.

3-Hydroxyoctanoic acid is a signalling chemical emitted by the orchid Cymbidium floribundum and is recognized by Japanese honeybees.

== Use in apiculture ==
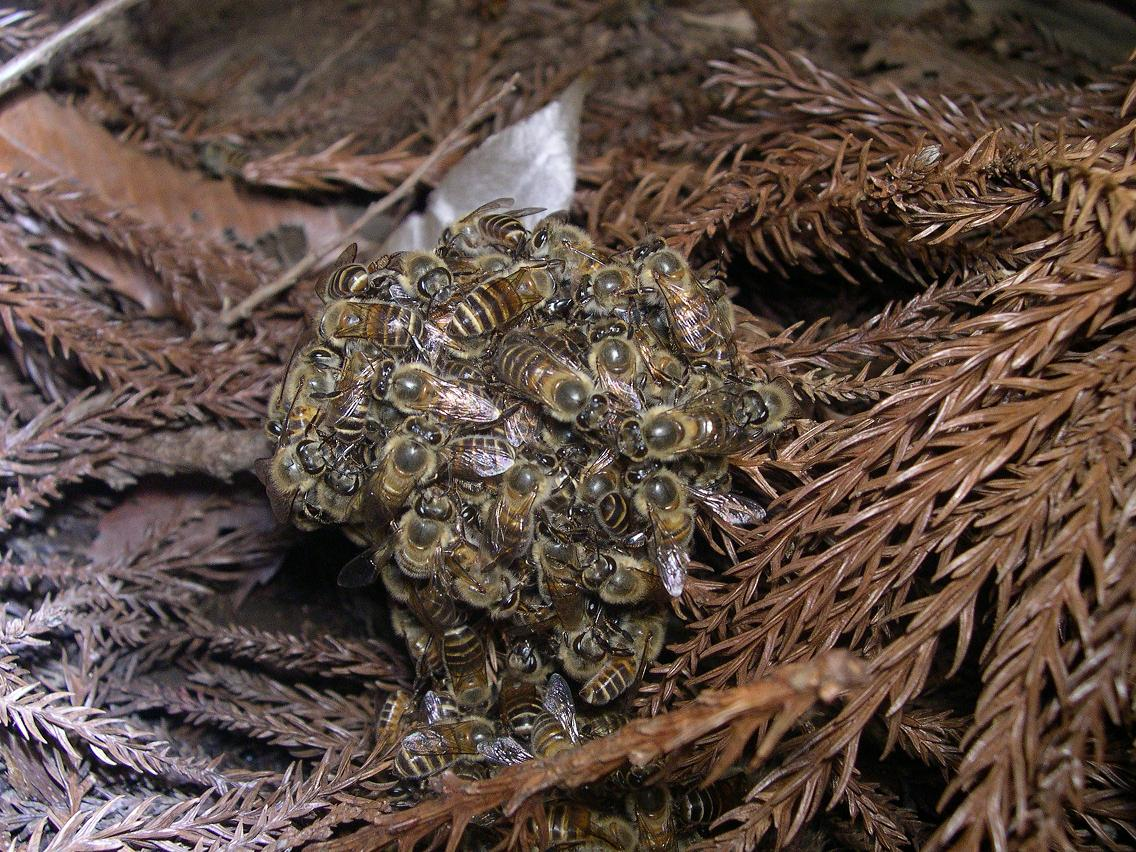
A defensive ball of Japanese honeybees in which two Japanese yellow hornets (Vespa simillima xanthoptera) were engulfed, heated and eventually killed.

Beekeepers in Japan attempted to introduce western honeybees (Apis mellifera) for the sake of their high productivity. However, western honeybees have no innate defense against Asian giant hornets, which can rapidly destroy their colonies. Japanese honeybees, having evolved alongside the Asian giant hornet, have numerous defensive strategies against the hornets and so are also used in apiculture in the country.

== Hive ==
Nest cavity ranges from 10 to 15 liters with a round comb structure that tends to be uneven. A. c. japonica will also dismantle an old hive before moving on to a new one. While western honeybee colonies can have over 50,000 worker bees, a Japanese honeybee colony's maximum number of worker bees is 6,000 to 7,000.

== Pollination ==
A. c. japonica pollinates the endangered orchids Cymbidium kanran and Cymbidium goeringii despite not having nectar for the bees to collect, instead releasing pheromones used to orient forager bees returning to the hive as a deception tactic in order to be pollinated.

== Dancing ==
A. c. japonica, like many other honeybees, dance in order to inform nestmates of locations for "effective flower resources". However, unlike other honeybees, they do not dance for the location of propolis.

A. c. japonica also perform short waggle dances after their nest has been scouted by hornets or other competing bees in addition to hive smearing to facilitate the protection of the nest.

== Protective behaviors ==
When threatened by hornets or other competing honeybees, A. c. japonica will dance and smear plant material at the entrance of the hive. A threat consists of a hornet or competing bee arriving to the home nest and scouting it, smearing it with pheromones. Performing the dance triggers an emergency, bees will travel a short distance to gather plant material. A. c. japonica does not discriminate between plant texture, color, or the part of the plant. The bees will then stand at the hive entrance and chew up the plant to smear the juice over the entrance.

A. c. japonica has a well-known defensive behavior when dealing with hornets. Although a handful of Asian giant hornets can easily defeat the uncoordinated defenses of a honey bee colony, the Japanese honeybee (Apis cerana japonica) has an effective strategy.

As a hornet enters the hive, a mob of hundreds of honey bees surrounds it in a ball, completely covering it and preventing it from reacting effectively. The bees violently vibrate their flight muscles in much the same way as they do to heat the hive in cold conditions. This raises the temperature in the ball to the critical temperature of 46 °C (115 °F). In addition, the exertions of the honey bees raise the level of carbon dioxide (CO_{2}) in the ball. At that concentration of CO_{2}, the honey bees can tolerate up to 50 °C (122 °F), but the hornet cannot survive the combination of a temperature of 46 °C (115 °F) and high carbon dioxide level. Some bees do die along with the intruder, much as happens when they attack other intruders with their stings, but by killing the hornet scout, they prevent it from summoning reinforcements that would wipe out the entire colony.

Although it is a commonly accepted theory that the Asian giant hornet may be allowed to enter the Japanese honeybee hive, recent studies suggest that the Japanese honeybee and large hornets actually have a predator-prey “I see you” (ISY) relationship. The ISY relationship is supported by the observation that Japanese honeybee wingbeats become louder and increase in intensity as a bee-hawking wasp (such as the Asian hornet (Vespa velutina), lesser banded hornet (Vespa affinis), Japanese yellow hornet (Vespa simillima xanthoptera), or Asian giant hornet (Vespa mandarinia)) moves closer to the entrance of the hive and that, in most cases, the hornet may retreat when it hears the sound. If the hornet moves closer to the hive, the Japanese honeybees move their wings faster to intensify the warning to the wasp. If the wasp enters the nest the bees will increase their wing movement, form a ball and raise their body temperature.
