= 2-Butoxyethanol acetate =

Names
- Preferred IUPAC name 2-Butoxyethyl acetate
- Other names 2-Butoxyethanol acetate Butyl Cellosolve acetate Butyl glycol acetate EGBEA; Ektasolve EB acetate Ethylene glycol butyl ether acetate

Identifiers
CAS Number	112-07-2
3D model (JSmol)	Interactive image
ChemSpider	7868
ECHA InfoCard	100.003.576
PubChem CID	8160
RTECS number	KJ8925000
UNII	WK5367RE39
CompTox Dashboard (EPA)	DTXSID1026904
- InChI: InChI=1S/C8H16O3/c1-3-4-5-10-6-7-11-8(2)9/h3-7H2,1-2H3 Key: NQBXSWAWVZHKBZ-UHFFFAOYSA-N; InChI=1/C8H16O3/c1-3-4-5-10-6-7-11-8(2)9/h3-7H2,1-2H3 Key: NQBXSWAWVZHKBZ-UHFFFAOYAN
- SMILES: CCCCOCCOC(=O)C

Properties
Chemical formula	C_{8}H_{16}O_{3}
Molar mass	160.2
Appearance	colorless liquid
Odor	pleasant, sweet, fruity
Density	0.94 g/mL
Melting point	−63 °C; −82 °F; 210 K
Boiling point	192 °C; 378 °F; 465 K
Solubility in water	1.5% at 20°C
Vapor pressure	0.3 mmHg

Hazards
Flash point	71 °C; 160 °F; 344 K
Autoignition temperature	340 °C (644 °F; 613 K)
Explosive limits	0.88% at 200 °F (93 °C) - 8.54% at 275 °F (135 °C)
- NIOSH (US health exposure limits)
PEL (Permissible)	none
REL (Recommended)	TWA 5 ppm (33 mg/m^{3})
IDLH (Immediate danger)	N.D.
- Except where otherwise noted, data are given for materials in their standard state (at 25 °C [77 °F], 100 kPa). Infobox references

2-Butoxyethanol acetate is a chemical commonly used as a solvent; it is the acetate of 2-butoxyethanol.

== Applications ==
2-Butoxyethanol acetate is used in a variety of industries as a solvent for nitrocellulose and multicolored lacquers, varnishes, enamels, and epoxy resin. It is useful as a solvent because of its high boiling point. It is also used in the manufacture of polyvinyl acetate latex. It is an ingredient in ink removers and spot removers.

== Safety ==
It will react strongly with oxidizers. Its safety profile is similar to 2-butoxyethanol.

People can be exposed to 2-butoxyethanol acetate in the workplace by breathing it in, swallowing it, skin absorption, or eye contact. Symptoms of exposure include irritation of the eyes, skin, nose, and throat, hemolysis (bursting of red blood cells), hematuria (blood in the urine), central nervous system depression, headache, and vomiting. Chronic exposure can cause kidney damage, liver damage, and blood disease. People who work in printing, silk-screening, automobile repair, spray-painting, and furniture production may be exposed to 2-butoxyethanol acetate in the workplace.

People who do not work with 2-butoxyethanol acetate can be exposed to it in small amounts by touching or breathing in fumes from household cleaners.
