= Methylenolactocin =

Names
- IUPAC name (2S,3R)-4-Methylidene-5-oxo-2-pentyloxolane-3-carboxylic acid

Identifiers
CAS Number	112923-53-2
3D model (JSmol)	Interactive image
ChemSpider	118131
PubChem CID	133968
UNII	6A2EXC8CNC
CompTox Dashboard (EPA)	DTXSID40920955
- InChI: InChI=1S/C11H16O4/c1-3-4-5-6-8-9(10(12)13)7(2)11(14)15-8/h8-9H,2-6H2,1H3,(H,12,13)/t8-,9+/m0/s1 Key: YZCRACGZKLIGLZ-DTWKUNHWSA-N
- SMILES: CCCCC[C@H]1[C@@H](C(=C)C(=O)O1)C(=O)O

Properties
Chemical formula	C_{11}H_{16}O_{4}
Molar mass	212.245 g·mol^{−1}
- Except where otherwise noted, data are given for materials in their standard state (at 25 °C [77 °F], 100 kPa). Infobox references

Methylenolactocin is a chemical compound that has been isolated from Penicillium. It has weak activity in an animal model of Ehrlich carcinoma.
