= 2,2-Diethoxytetrahydrofuran =

Names
- Preferred IUPAC name 2,2-Diethoxyoxolane

Identifiers
| CAS Number | 52263-97-5 |
| 3D model (JSmol) | Interactive image |
| ChemSpider | 318092 |
| ECHA InfoCard | 100.161.490 |
| EC Number | 633-422-4 |
| PubChem CID | 358290 |
| UNII | GD3AP58UTV |
| CompTox Dashboard (EPA) | DTXSID60326839 |
- InChI: InChI=1S/C8H16O3/c1-3-9-8(10-4-2)6-5-7-11-8/h3-7H2,1-2H3 Key: HRKTYSDVSRVOIP-UHFFFAOYSA-N
- SMILES: CCOC1(CCCO1)OCC

Properties
| Chemical formula | C_{8}H_{16}O_{3} |
| Molar mass | 160.213 g·mol^{−1} |
- Except where otherwise noted, data are given for materials in their standard state (at 25 °C [77 °F], 100 kPa). Infobox references

2,2-Diethoxytetrahydrofuran is a cyclic orthoester which can be reacted with diols to biodegradable polyorthoesters.

== Preparation ==
The synthesis of 2,2-diethoxytetrahydrofuran via γ-butyrolactone and the Meerwein salt (triethyloxonium tetrafluoroborate) in diethyl ether was first described by Hans Meerwein and co-workers. In the reaction the electrophilic ethyl cation attacks the carbonyl oxygen and forms the stable but extraordinarily hygroscopic O-ethyl-γ-butyrolactonium tetrafluoroborate (melting point 42 °C). The compound dissolves in dichloromethane, chloroform and 1,2-dichloroethane but is insoluble in diethyl ether, benzene and tetrachloromethane. The onium salt reacts practically quantitatively with an ethanolate anion from sodium ethoxide in ethanol forming 2,2-diethoxytetrahydrofuran.

2,2-Diethoxytetrahydrofuran can also be produced in a solvent-free one-pot reaction using γ-butyrolactone, orthoformic triethyl ester and gaseous boron trifluoride. This route avoids the use of diethyl ether and its side-products and sensible intermediates.

First diethoxymethylium tetrafluoroborate is formed from the triethyl orthoformate and boron trifluoride at −30 °C. This electrophilically attacks the carbonyl group of the γ-butyrolactone and the O-ethyl-γ-butyrolactonium tetrafluoroborate. The addition of sodium ethoxide leads to the final product, which is obtained after distillation in 69% overall yield.

The reaction proceeds under gentle conditions (<0 °C) and the almost quantitative addition of ethanolate to O-ethyl-γ-butyrolactonium tetrafluoroborate can also be catalyzed by bases such as ammonia and triethylamine.

== Properties ==
2,2-Diethoxytetrahydrofuran is a clear liquid which boils at 10 mm Hg vacuum at 60 - 61.5 °C according to the original literature.

== Application ==
The cyclic orthoester 2,2-diethoxytetrahydrofuran is a reactive bifunctional monomer which forms biodegradable polyorthoesters of the type POE-I by transesterification with α, ω-diols.

Polyorthoesters are used as embedding media for pharmaceuticals in depot drug dosage forms for controlled drug release by surface erosion under physiological conditions.
