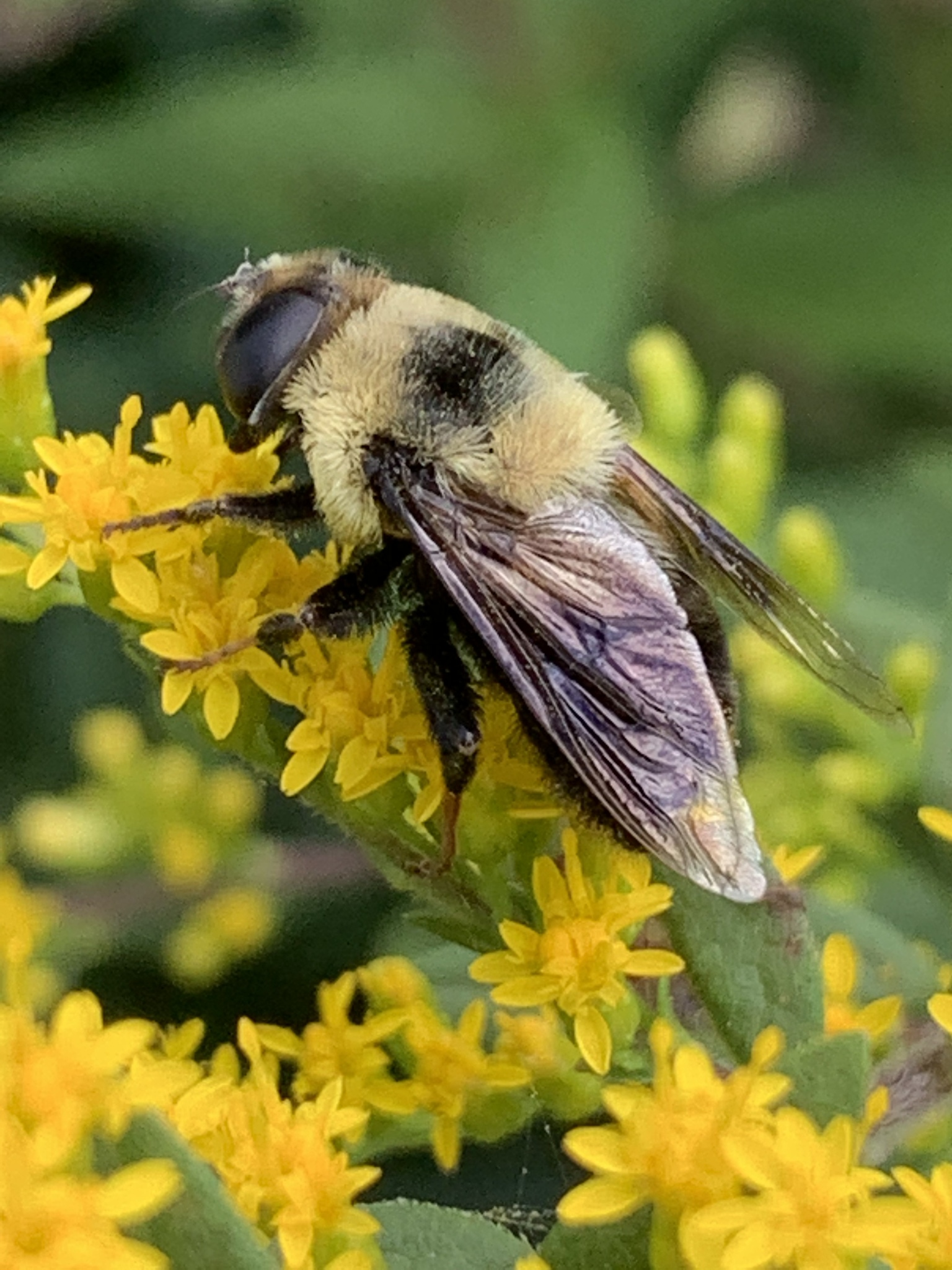
- Female
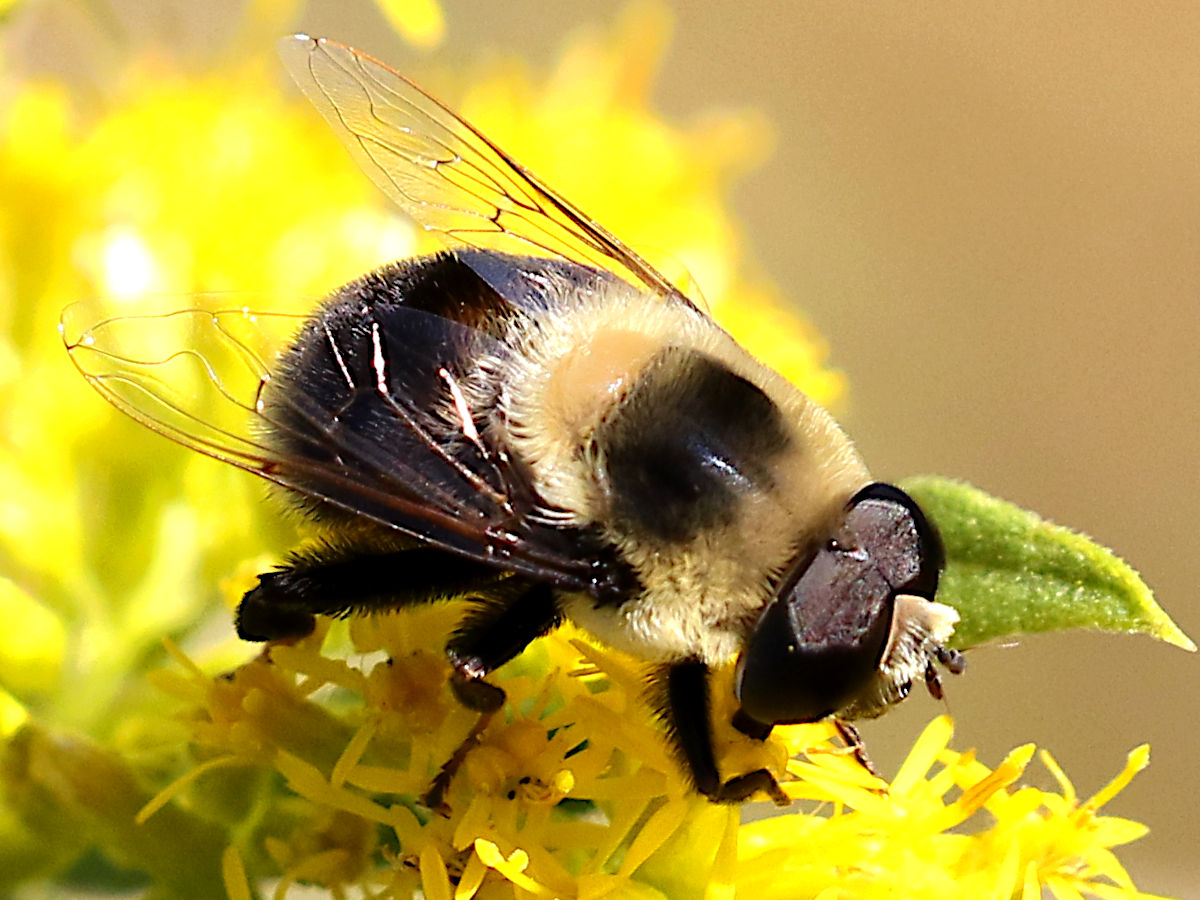
- Male

Scientific classification
- Kingdom: Animalia
- Phylum: Arthropoda
- Clade: Pancrustacea
- Class: Insecta
- Order: Diptera
- Family: Syrphidae
- Genus: Eristalis
- Species: E. flavipes

Binomial name
- Eristalis flavipes Walker, 1849

Synonyms
- Eristalis americanus Loew, 1866; Eristalis melanostomus Hull, 1925; Eristalis rufipilis Osten Sacken, 1878; Musca tomentosa Gott, 1964

= Eristalis flavipes =

Species of fly

Eristalis flavipes, the orange-legged drone fly, is a species of hoverfly native to North America. It flies from early April to mid-October, and occurs in a wide variety of habitats, particularly wetlands. Hoverflies get their names from the ability to remain nearly motionless while in flight. The adults are also known as flower flies for they are commonly found around and on flowers, from which they get both energy-giving nectar and protein-rich pollen. The larvae are aquatic filter-feeders of the rat-tailed type.

== Description ==
Eristalis flavipes strongly resembles a bumblebee.
For terms see Morphology of Diptera. It is 13 to 17 mm long.

Head

The face, cheeks (gena) and facial stripe are shining black with short yellow pile. The antennae are dark brown and plumose basally. The eyes are broadly contiguous in the male, with eye pile confined mostly to a vertical stripe.

Thorax

The mesonotum, pleurae, and scutellum, with very abundant, long, bright yellow pile over shining black except the center of the nearly hairless mesonotum. The scutellum is wholly light yellow.

Abdomen

The abdomen is a deep shining black with the second segment dark red and covered with long black hairs with some yellow hairs intermixed.

Wings

The wings are hyaline with luteous veins. The female has a large brown spot at the central part of wing. The wing veination: includes a sinuous r_{4+5} vein, a closed cell r1. The anterior cross- vein (r-m) is oblique and near the middle of discal cell (dm).

Legs

The legs are deep black, with black pile. Joints are reddish the anterior tarsi are brown, the middle and posterior tarsi are light reddish-yellow. The hind femora are somewhat elongate. The hind tibiae are bent.

Eristalis wing

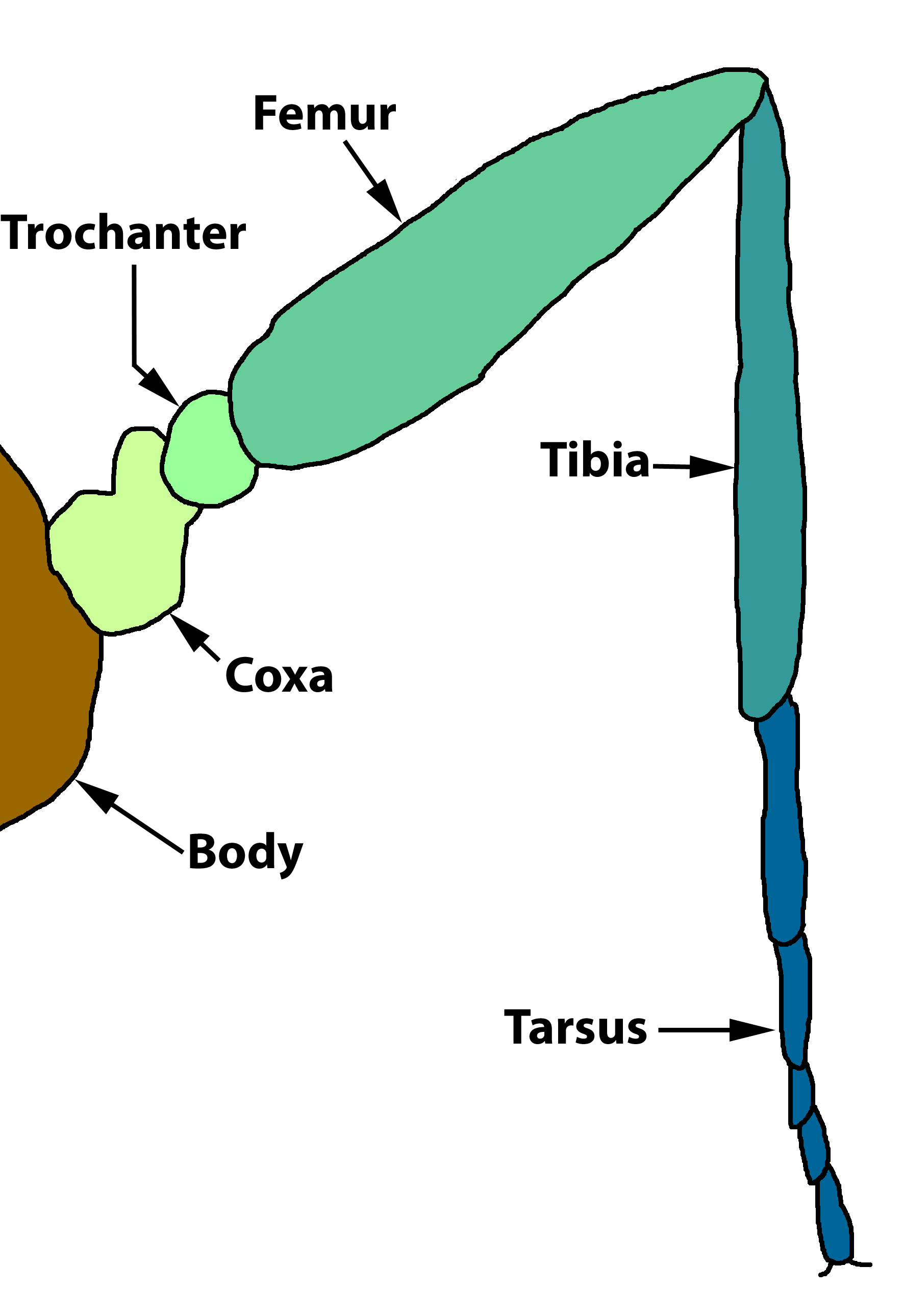
Insect leg

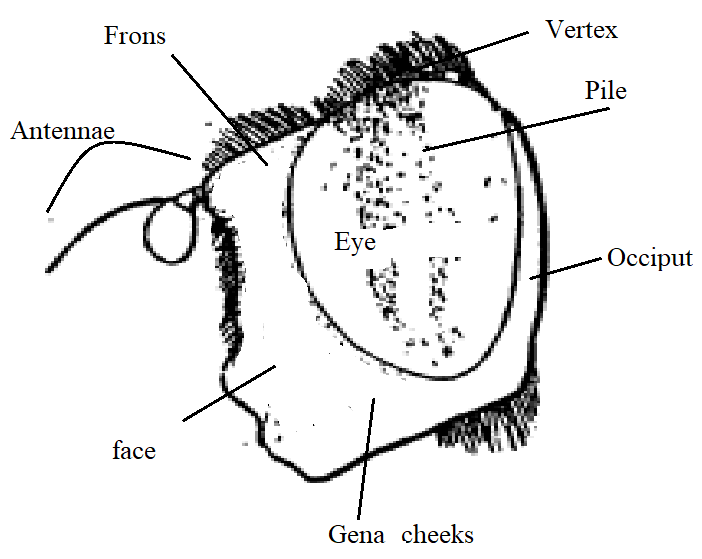
Eristalis head

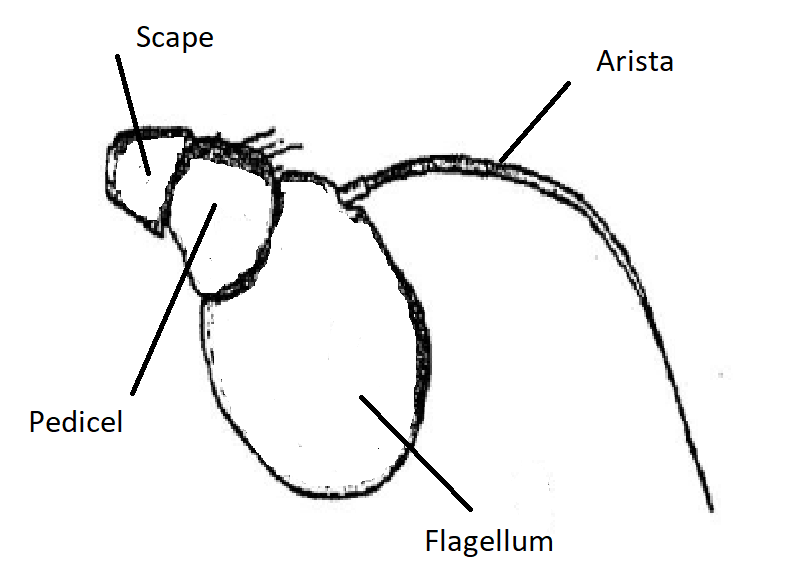
Syrphid antenna

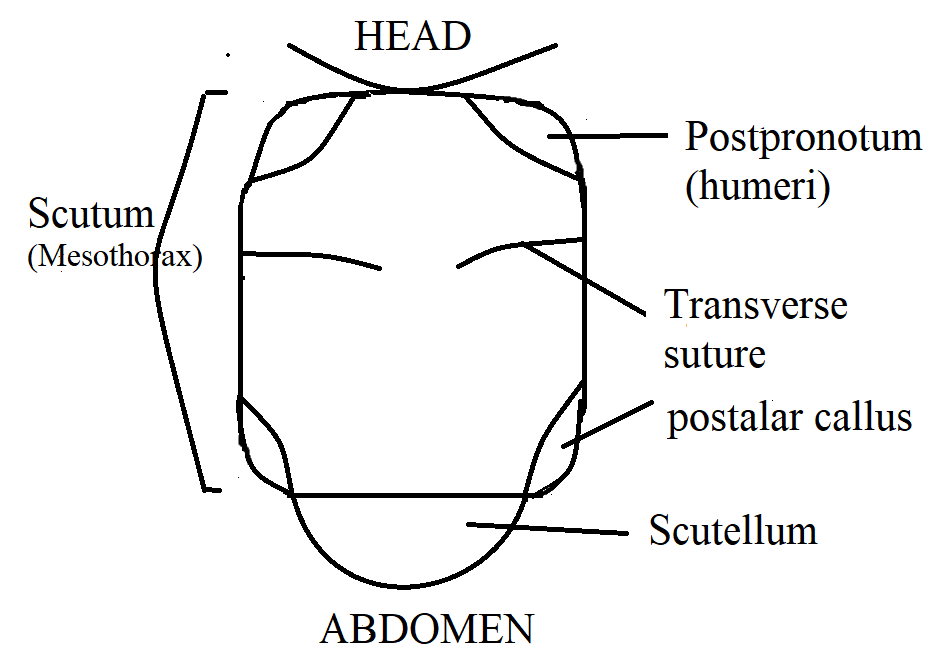
Dorsal view of Syrphid thorax
