= 3,9-Diethylidene-2,4,8,10-tetraoxaspiro(5.5)undecane =

Chemical compound

3,9-Diethylidene-2,4,8,10-tetraoxaspiro[5.5]undecane

Names
- Preferred IUPAC name 3,9-Diethylidene-2,4,8,10-tetraoxaspiro[5.5]undecane

Identifiers
CAS Number	65967-52-4
3D model (JSmol)	Interactive image
ChemSpider	170316
ECHA InfoCard	100.254.405
PubChem CID	196589
UNII	A2H1MR4CXK
- InChI: InChI=1S/C11H16O4/c1-3-9-12-5-11(6-13-9)7-14-10(4-2)15-8-11/h3-4H,5-8H2,1-2H3/b9-3-,10-4- Key: ZNCFMBOWBMPEAC-UIYSNZQUSA-N
- SMILES: CC=C1OCC2(CO1)COC(=CC)OC2

Properties
Chemical formula	C_{11}H_{16}O_{4}
- Except where otherwise noted, data are given for materials in their standard state (at 25 °C [77 °F], 100 kPa). Infobox references

3,9-Diethylidene-2,4,8,10-tetraoxaspiro[5.5]undecane (DETOSU) is a bicyclic ketene acetal derived from the isomeric allyl acetal 3,9-divinyl-2,4,8,10-tetraoxaspiro[5.5]undecane (DVTOSU). As a bifunctional monomer, DETOSU is an important building block for polyorthoesters formed by the addition of diols to the activated double bond of the diketene acetal.

== Preparation ==
DETOSU is prepared in a rearrangement reaction of DVTOSU, it is an exothermic reaction that also occurs spontaneously with complete conversion. For production on an industrial scale, the rearranged is carried out at elevated temperatures in the presence of catalysts.

The rearrangement reaction can be carried out in alkaline medium (such as with n-butyllithium in ethylenediamine or potassium tert-butoxide in ethylenediamine) but also photochemically by UV irradiation in the presence of iron pentacarbonyl as catalyst and triethylamine in boiling pentane or with dichlorotris(triphenylphosphine)ruthenium(II) / sodium carbonate in bulk.

In order to obtain purities sufficient for the use as a monomer, the crude product (obtained after the rearrangement reaction and vacuum distillation) must be recrystallized several times from pentane. The yields of pure product are about 50%.

== Properties ==
3,9-Diethylidene-2,4,8,10-tetraoxaspiro[5.5]undecane is, when pure, a crystalline material at room temperature. Because of its low crystallization tendency, it is mostly used as a liquid. DETOSU is relatively unstable. It hydrolyzes rapidly even in the presence of only water traces and spontaneously isomerizes during storage to the diallylacetal DVTOSU, which is inactive for the polymerization. The pure substance is very reactive against the attack of electrophilic agents and ows a strong tendency for cationic polymerization. A characteristic property of DETOSU is the intense IR band at 1700 cm^{−1}, which is also used to monitor the conversion in the rearrangement reaction.

== Use ==
The diketene acetal 3,9-diethylidene-2,4,8,10-tetraoxaspiro[5.5]undecane, DETOSU, is a reactive bifunctional monomer that forms biodegradable polyorthoesters by polyaddition with α,ω-diols.

Polyorthoesters are used as embedding media for pharmaceuticals in extended release formulations for controlled drug release by surface erosion under physiological conditions.
