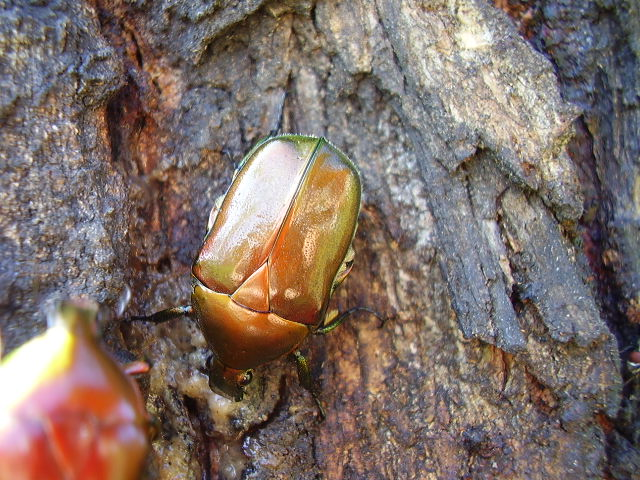

Scientific classification
- Domain: Eukaryota
- Kingdom: Animalia
- Phylum: Arthropoda
- Class: Insecta
- Order: Coleoptera
- Suborder: Polyphaga
- Infraorder: Scarabaeiformia
- Family: Scarabaeidae
- Subfamily: Cetoniinae
- Tribe: Goliathini
- Subtribe: Coryphocerina
- Genus: Pseudotorynorrhina
- Species: P. japonica

Binomial name
- Pseudotorynorrhina japonica (Hope, 1841)

Synonyms
- Rhomborhina japonica Hope, 1841; Rhomborrhina japonica Hope, 1841

= Pseudotorynorrhina japonica =

Species of beetle

Pseudotorynorrhina japonica, the drone beetle, also called kanabun (カナブン, 金蚊), is a large beetle species in the genus Pseudotorynorrhina.

== Appearance ==
It has emerald-green wings, although some have a bronze tinge.
