= 3-Hydroxyoctanoic acid =

Names
- Preferred IUPAC name 3-Hydroxyoctanoic acid
- Other names 3-Hydroxycaprylic acid; β-Hydroxyoctanoic acid

Identifiers
CAS Number	14292-27-4
3D model (JSmol)	Interactive image
ChEBI	CHEBI:37098
ChemSpider	24791
MeSH	C101940
PubChem CID	26613
UNII	8M44B02CSJ
CompTox Dashboard (EPA)	DTXSID00864487
- InChI: InChI=1S/C8H16O3/c1-2-3-4-5-7(9)6-8(10)11/h7,9H,2-6H2,1H3,(H,10,11) Key: NDPLAKGOSZHTPH-UHFFFAOYSA-N; InChI=1/C8H16O3/c1-2-3-4-5-7(9)6-8(10)11/h7,9H,2-6H2,1H3,(H,10,11) Key: NDPLAKGOSZHTPH-UHFFFAOYAI
- SMILES: CCCCCC(CC(=O)O)O

Properties
Chemical formula	C_{8}H_{16}O_{3}
Molar mass	160.213 g·mol^{−1}
- Except where otherwise noted, data are given for materials in their standard state (at 25 °C [77 °F], 100 kPa). Infobox references

3-Hydroxyoctanoic acid is a beta-hydroxy acid that is naturally produced in humans, other animals, and plants.

3-Hydroxyoctanoic acid is the primary endogenous agonist of hydroxycarboxylic acid receptor 3 (HCA_{3}), a G protein-coupled receptor protein which is encoded by the human gene HCAR3. In plants, signalling chemical emitted by the orchid Cymbidium floribundum and recognized by Japanese honeybees (Apis cerana japonica).
