= Polyorthoester =

Polyorthoesters are polymers with the general structure –[–R–O–C(R_{1}, OR_{2})–O–R_{3}–]_{n}– whereas the residue R_{2} can also be part of a heterocyclic ring with the residue R. Polyorthoesters are formed by transesterification of orthoesters with diols or by polyaddition between a diol and a diketene acetal, such as 3,9-diethylidene-2,4,8,10-tetraoxaspiro[5.5]undecane.

== Applications ==
Polyorthoesters are used as hydrophobic implant materials for drug depots for continuous drug delivery by surface erosion. The active ingredient (which is homogeneously dispersed in a matrix of polyorthoester) should be released as evenly as possible into the human or animal organism over an extended period of time in a zero-order release kinetics. Four classes of polyorthoesters (polyorthoesters type I - IV) are well characterized as biodegradable polymers for drug implants, primarily through work of Jorge Heller (1927–2009).

== Production ==
=== 1st generation polyorthoester (POE I) ===
Polyorthoester type I is (usually) obtained by transesterification of an α,ω-diol with 2,2-diethoxytetrahydrofuran (synthesized from γ-butyrolactone and triethylorthoformate).

In polycondensation small molecules are formed (in this case of ethanol), which have to be removed from the equilibrium to achieve the necessary molar mass of the polymer for the use as an implant material. The solid polyorthoester type I is hydrophobic and particularly acid-sensitive. In an aquatic environment it autocatalytically hydrolysis in an uncontrolled fashion. Therefore, it must be stabilized by adding an alkaline pharmaceutical excipient when used as an implant material.

The degradation of the polymer chain sets free the initial diol and γ-butyrolactone, which is further hydrolyzed to 4-hydroxybutanoic acid. The 4-hydroxybutanoic acid formed is responsible for the locally lowered pH value upon polymer degradation.

The commercial use of polyorthoester type I was prevented by the required addition of a base (e.g. sodium carbonate), the difficult synthesis and its unsatisfactory mechanical properties.

=== 2nd generation polyorthoesters (POE II) ===
Polyorthoesters type II are formed by polyaddition of a α,ω-diol and the diketene acetal 3,9-diethylidene-2,4,8,10-tetraoxaspiro[5.5]undecane (DETOSU). The polyaddition forms much more quickly high molecular weight polymers than the transesterification does and in contrast to polyorthoester type I no small molecules are released. For the reaction, the monomers are dissolved in tetrahydrofuran and small amounts of an acidic catalyst are added, e. g. p-toluenesulfonic acid. The molecular weight of the polymers can be controlled by the molar ratio of the reactants. The addition of triols leads to crosslinked polymers, whereas the crosslinking density is determined by the ratio of triol/diol. The polymerization takes already place rapidly at room temperature and ambient pressure and allows the formation of a polymer matrix in the presence of sensitive pharmaceutically active agents.

The solid polyorthoester type II polymers are very hydrophobic, storable in the dry and significantly less sensitive to acid than polyorthoester type I. The pH-sensitivity (and thus the rate of degradation in physiological media) as well as the glass transition temperature (and thus the mechanical and thermal properties) can be controlled through the use of diols of different chain flexibility. polyorthoester type II with molecular weights of up to about 100,000 have therefore a glassy-hard (e. g. when using the rigid 1,4-cyclohexanedimethanol) to semi-soft consistency (when using the flexible 1,6-hexanediol). In the aqueous medium a two-stage, non-autocatalytic hydrolysis takes place, initially generating neutral fragments (pentaerythritol dipropionate and the diol).

The propionic acid produced in the second step is metabolized so rapidly that a local lowering of the pH value does occur. Therefore, to accelerate polymer degradation acidic additives must be added (such as octanedioic acid, hexanedioic acid or 2-methylidenebutanedioic acid). Zero-order release kinetics were achieved when embedding the cytostatic agent 5-fluorouracil. In toxicity tests as specified in the US Pharmacopeia USP polyorthoester preparations were found to be acutely nontoxic in cellular, intradermal, systemic and intramuscular implants.

=== 3rd generation polyorthoester (POE III) ===
polyorthoester type III is prepared just like POE I by transesterification, in this case a triol (preferably 1,2,6-hexanetriol) with an orthoester (e. g. triethylorthoacetate).

The triethylorthoacetate reacts initially to the corresponding cyclic orthoester with the vicinal hydroxyl groups of the 1,2,6-hexanetriol, which is homopolymerized to polyorthoester type III by reaction with the 6-position hydroxyl group. Polyorthoesters type III are at room temperature semi-solid to ointment-like due to the very flexible polymer backbone. They allow the incorporation of thermally labile and solvent-sensitive active ingredients at room temperature without the use of organic solvents. Such drug implants are particularly suitable for applications on the eye, where no sudden release occurs by diffusion (initial burst release) but the release follows the continuous polymer degradation. Also for Polyorthoesters type III the degradation occurs at the surface by cleavage of the hydrolytically labile bonds in the polymer backbone.

Depending on the initial bond cleavage on the quaternary carbon atom 1-, 2-, or 6-acetoxy-hexanetriol is formed, which is further degraded to acetic acid and 1,2,6-hexanetriol. The use of polyorthoester type III for biomedical applications is severely limited by the lengthy synthesis of polymers having useful molecular weights and poor reproducibility.

=== 4th generation polyorthoesters: POE IV ===
The polyorthoester type IV is a further development of the type polyorthoester type II, which is formed of the diketene acetal DETOSU with a diol which is modified by short sequences of polyglycolide or polylactide. Depending on the type of diol used polyorthoester type IV can be synthesized as gel (with a low glass transition temperature Tg, meaning low molecular weight) or as a solid. Polyorthoester type IV-types are also accessible under the very mild conditions of interfacial polycondensation.

Polyorthoester type IV avoids the addition of acidic excipients required in polyorthoester type II, which often diffuse uncontrolled out of the polymer matrix and thus lead to erratic degradation kinetics. During the degradation of the polyorthoesters polyorthoester type IV in aqueous media glycolic acid or lactic acid is produced, which further catalyze hydrolysis.

The degradation rate can be controlled by the proportion of glycolic or lactic acid in the sequence. Implants made of polyorthoester type IV show surface erosion while being highly biocompatible with degradation times from days to months and can thus also be used as a long-term drug depots, e. g. for the cytostatic agent 5-fluorouracil. Polyorthoesters type IV are considered the most promising members of this class as implant materials for controlled drug release.

== Literature ==
- Biodegradable Polymers as Drug Delivery Systems, in Drugs and the Pharmaceutical Sciences, vol. 45, Marcel Dekker, Inc., 1990, ISBN 0-8247-8344-1
- K. E. Uhrich; S. M. Cannizzaro; R. S. Langer; K. M. Shakesheff (1999), "Polymeric Systems for Controlled Drug Release", Chem. Rev., vol. 99, no. 11, pp. 3181–3198, doi:10.1021/cr940351u, PMID 11749514
- J. Heller, "Biopolymers I: Poly (ortho esters)", Advances in Polymer Science, vol. 107, pp. 41–92, doi:10.1007/BFb0027551
- Biodegradable Polymers for Industrial Applications, vol. 45, CRC Press, 17 May 2005, ISBN 0-8493-3466-7
- J. H. Park; M. Ye; K. Park (2005), "Biodegradable Polymers for Microencapsulation of Drugs" (mdpi.org), Macromolecules, vol. 10, no. 1, pp. 146–161, doi:10.3390/10010146, PMC 6147704, PMID 18007283
- Biomaterials Science: An Introduction to Materials in Medicine (3. ed.), Academic Press, 2013, ISBN 978-0-12-374626-9
