= Apis nearctica =

Apis nearctica Temporal range: Middle Miocene

Scientific classification
- Kingdom: Animalia
- Phylum: Arthropoda
- Class: Insecta
- Order: Hymenoptera
- Family: Apidae
- Genus: Apis
- Species: †A. nearctica

Binomial name
- †Apis nearctica Engel, Hinojosa-Díaz & Rasnitsyn, 2009

Extinct species of bee

Apis nearctica is an extinct species of honey bee which existed in what is now Nevada during the Middle Miocene period. It was discovered at Stewart Valley, Nevada, and described by Michael S. Engel, Ismael A. Hinojosa-Díaz, and Alexandr P. Rasnitsyn in 2009.

The species belongs to the extinct armbrusteri species group, is most similar to the extinct species Apis armbrusteri from the Miocene of southwestern Germany, and both species may be related by geological range.

This is the first and only known Apis species range in the New World (although it is a fossil), and is the first and only fossil species ranged there.
