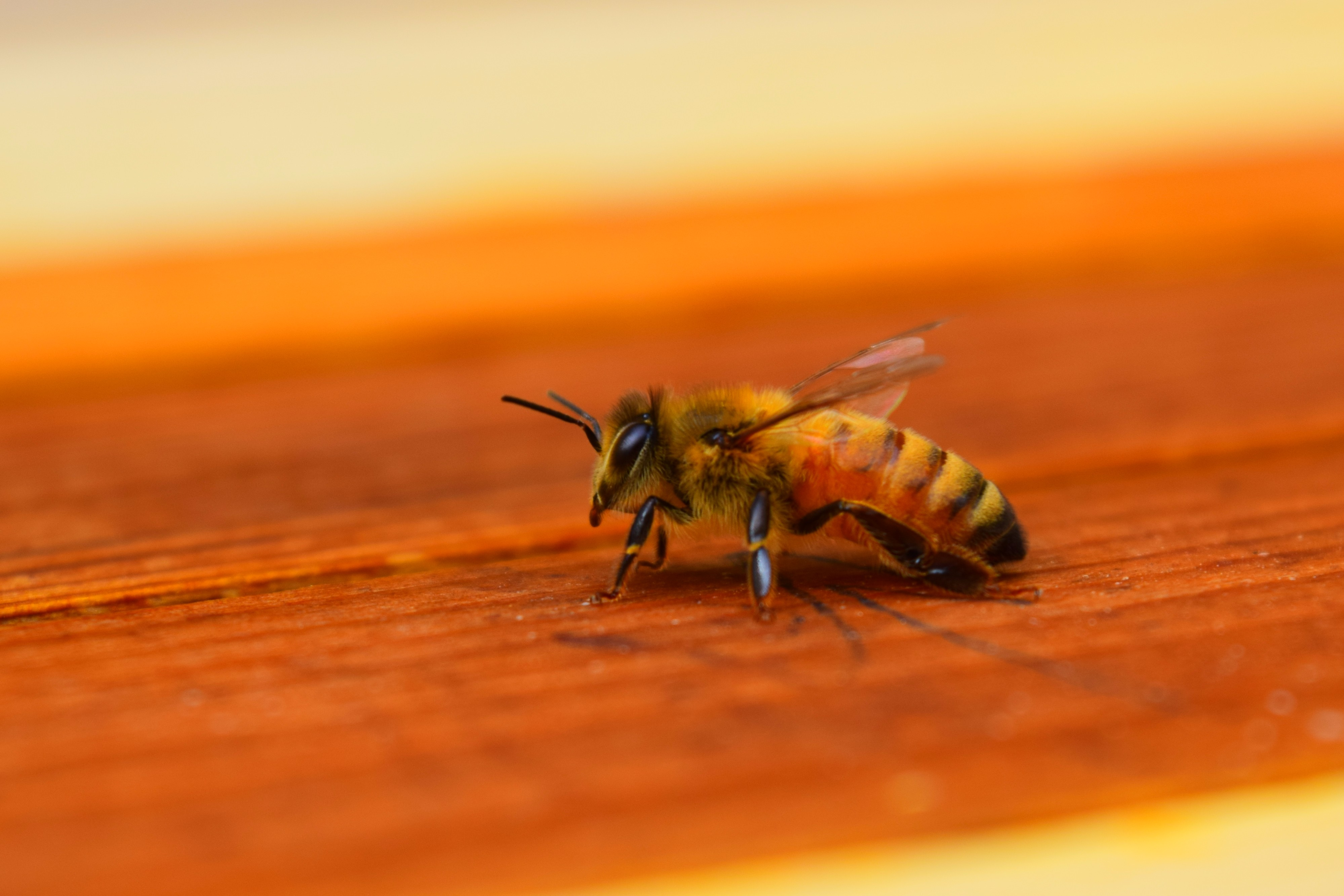
- Western honey bee on the bars of a horizontal top-bar hive

Scientific classification
- Kingdom: Animalia
- Phylum: Arthropoda
- Clade: Pancrustacea
- Class: Insecta
- Order: Hymenoptera
- Family: Apidae
- Clade: Corbiculata
- Tribe: Apini; Latreille, 1802
- Genus: Apis; Linnaeus, 1758

Type species
- Apis mellifera Linnaeus, 1758

Species
- †Apis lithohermaea; †Apis nearctica; Subgenus Micrapis: Apis andreniformis; Apis florea; Subgenus Megapis: Apis dorsata; Apis laboriosa; Subgenus Apis: †Apis antejaponica; Apis cerana; Apis koschevnikovi; Apis mellifera; Apis nigrocincta

= Honey bee =

Honey bee Temporal range: Oligocene–Recent

Colonial flying insect

Honeybees on yellow ironweed. Followed by segment at one-tenth speed.

A honey bee (also spelled honeybee) is a eusocial flying insect from the genus Apis of the largest bee family, Apidae. Honey bees are known for their creation of perennial nests within cavities (i.e. beehives) containing hexagonal cells made of secreted wax, their large colony sizes, and their routine regurgitation of digested carbohydrates as surplus food storage in the form of honey, the lattermost of which distinguishes their hives as a prized foraging target of many mellivorous animals including honey badgers, bears and human hunter-gatherers.

Although honey bees represent only a small fraction of the roughly 20,000 known species of bees, they are the bee clade most familiar to humans and are also the most valuable beneficial insects to agriculture and horticulture. The best-known honey bee species is the western honey bee (Apis mellifera), which was domesticated and farmed (i.e. beekeeping) for honey production and crop pollination. The only other domesticated species is the eastern honey bee (Apis cerana), which are raised in South, Southeast and East Asia.

Only members of the genus Apis are true honey bees, but some other bee species also produce and store honey and have been kept by humans for that purpose, including the stingless bees belonging to the genus Melipona and the Indian stingless or dammar bee Tetragonula iridipennis. In addition to harvesting honey, modern humans also use beeswax in making candles, soap, lip balms and various cosmetics, as a lubricant and in mould-making using the lost wax process. Other honey bee secretions such as royal jelly and bee venom are used pharmaceutically, especially in alternative medicine.

== Etymology and name ==
The genus name Apis is Latin for "bee". Although modern dictionaries may refer to Apis as either honey bee or honeybee, entomologist Robert Snodgrass asserts that correct usage requires two words, i.e., honey bee, because it is a kind or type of bee. It is incorrect to run the two words together, as in dragonfly or butterfly, which are appropriate because dragonflies and butterflies are not flies. Honey bee, not honeybee, is the listed common name in the Integrated Taxonomic Information System, the Entomological Society of America Common Names of Insects Database, and the Tree of Life Web Project.

== Origin, systematics, and distribution ==
Distribution of honey bees around the world

Morphology of a sterile female worker honey bee

All honey bees are nectar-feeding pollinators native to mainland Afro-Eurasia, but human migrations and colonizations to the New World since the Age of Discovery have been responsible for the introduction of multiple subspecies of the western honey bee into South America (early 16th century), North America (early 17th century) and Australia (early 19th century), resulting in the current cosmopolitan distribution of honey bees in all continents except Antarctica.

Honey bees appear to have their center of origin in South and Southeast Asia (including the Philippines), as all the extant species except Apis mellifera are native to that region. Notably, living representatives of the earliest lineages to diverge (Apis florea and Apis andreniformis) have their center of origin there.

The first Apis bees appear in the fossil record at the Eocene–Oligocene boundary (34 mya), in European deposits. The origin of these prehistoric honey bees does not necessarily indicate Europe as the place of origin of the genus, only that the bees were present in Europe by that time. Few fossil deposits are known from South Asia, the suspected region of honey bee origin, and fewer still have been thoroughly studied.

No Apis species existed in the New World during human times before the introduction of A. mellifera by Europeans. Only one fossil species is documented from the New World, Apis nearctica, known from a single 14 million-year-old specimen from Nevada.

The close relatives of modern honey bees—e.g., bumblebees and stingless bees—are also social to some degree, and social behavior is considered to be a trait that predates the origin of the genus. Among the extant members of Apis, the more basal species make single, exposed combs, while the more recently evolved species nest in cavities and have multiple combs, which has greatly facilitated their domestication.

=== Species ===
While about 20,000 species of bees exist, only eight extant species of honey bee are recognized, with a total of 43 subspecies, although historically seven to 11 species are recognized: Apis andreniformis (the black dwarf honey bee); Apis cerana (the eastern honey bee); Apis dorsata (the giant honey bee); Apis florea (the red dwarf honey bee); Apis koschevnikovi (Koschevnikov's honey bee); Apis laboriosa (the Himalayan giant honey bee); Apis mellifera (the western honey bee); and Apis nigrocincta (the Philippine honey bee).

Honey bees are the only extant members of the tribe Apini. Today's honey bees constitute three clades: Micrapis (the dwarf honey bees), Megapis (the giant honey bees), and Apis (the western honey bee and its close relatives).

Most species have historically been cultured or at least exploited for honey and beeswax by humans indigenous to their native ranges. Only two species have been truly domesticated: Apis mellifera and Apis cerana. A. mellifera has been cultivated at least since the time of the building of the Egyptian pyramids, and only that species has been moved extensively beyond its native range.

=== Micrapis ===
Apis florea and Apis andreniformis are small honey bees of southern and southeastern Asia. They make very small, exposed nests in trees and shrubs. Their stings are often incapable of penetrating human skin, so the hive and swarms can be handled with minimal protection. They occur largely sympatrically, though they are very distinct evolutionarily and are probably the result of allopatric speciation, their distribution later converging.

Given that A. florea is more widely distributed and A. andreniformis is considerably more aggressive, honey is, if at all, usually harvested from the former only. They are the earliest-diverging extant lineage of honey bees. Apis florea have smaller wing spans than its sister species. Apis florea are also completely yellow except the scutellum of workers, which is black.

=== Megapis ===
Two species are recognized in the subgenus Megapis. They usually build single or a few exposed combs on high tree limbs, on cliffs, and sometimes on buildings. They can be very fierce. Periodically robbed of their honey by human "honey hunters", colonies are easily capable of stinging a human being to death if provoked.

- Apis dorsata, the giant honey bee, is native and widespread across most of South and Southeast Asia.
  - A. d. binghami, the Indonesian giant honey bee, is classified as the Indonesian subspecies of the giant honey bee or a distinct species; in the latter case, A. d. breviligula and/or other lineages would probably also have to be considered species.
- Apis laboriosa, the Himalayan giant honey bee, was initially described as a distinct species. Later, it was included in A. dorsata as a subspecies based on the biological species concept, though authors applying a genetic species concept have suggested it should be considered a separate species and more recent research has confirmed this classification. Essentially restricted to the Himalayas, it differs little from the giant honey bee in appearance but has extensive behavioral adaptations that enable it to nest in the open at high altitudes despite low ambient temperatures. It is the largest living honey bee.

=== Apis ===
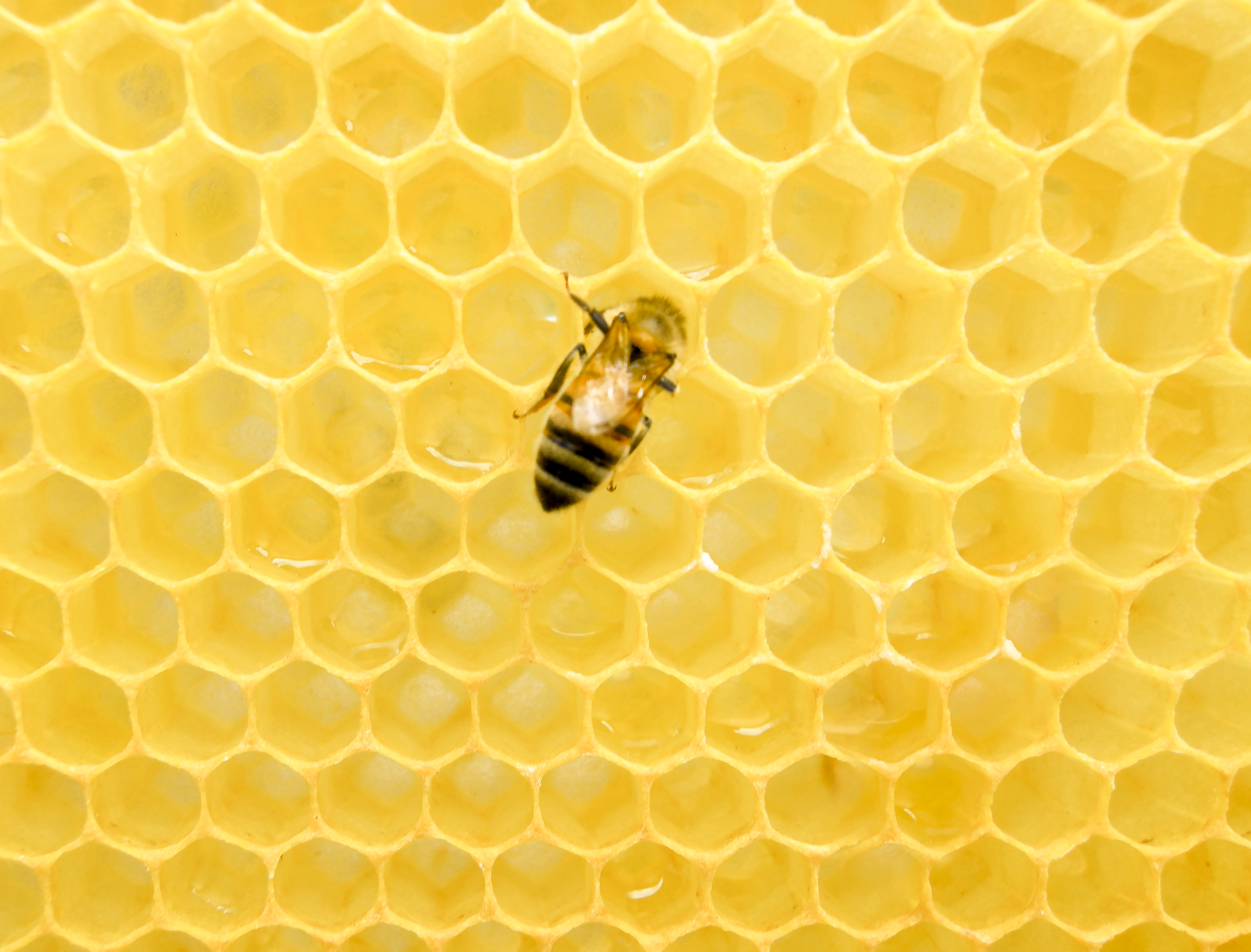
Western honey bee on a honeycomb

Eastern Apis species include three or four species, including A. koschevnikovi, A. nigrocincta, and A. cerana. The genetics of the western honey bee (A. mellifera) are unclear.

==== Koschevnikov's honey bee ====
Koschevnikov's honey bee (Apis koschevnikovi) is often referred to in the literature as the "red bee of Sabah"; however, A. koschevnikovi is pale reddish in Sabah State, Borneo, Malaysia, but a dark, coppery colour in the Malay Peninsula and Sumatra, Indonesia. Its habitat is limited to the tropical evergreen forests of the Malay Peninsula, Borneo and Sumatra and they do not live in tropical evergreen rain forests which extend into Thailand, Myanmar, Cambodia and Vietnam.

==== Philippine honey bee ====
Apis nigrocincta is a cavity-nesting species. The species has rust-coloured scapes, legs, and clypeuses, with reddish-tan hair colour that covers most of the body.

==== Eastern honey bee ====
Apis cerana, the eastern honey bee proper, is the traditional honey bee of southern and eastern Asia. One of its subspecies, the Indian honey bee (A. c. indica), was domesticated and kept in hives in a fashion similar to A. mellifera, though on a more limited, regional scale.

It has not yet been possible to resolve its relationship to the Bornean honey bee A. c. nuluensis and Apis nigrocincta from the Philippines to satisfaction; some researchers argue that these are indeed distinct species, but that A. cerana as defined is still paraphyletic, consisting of several separate species, though other researchers argue cerana is a single monophyletic species.

==== Western honey bee ====
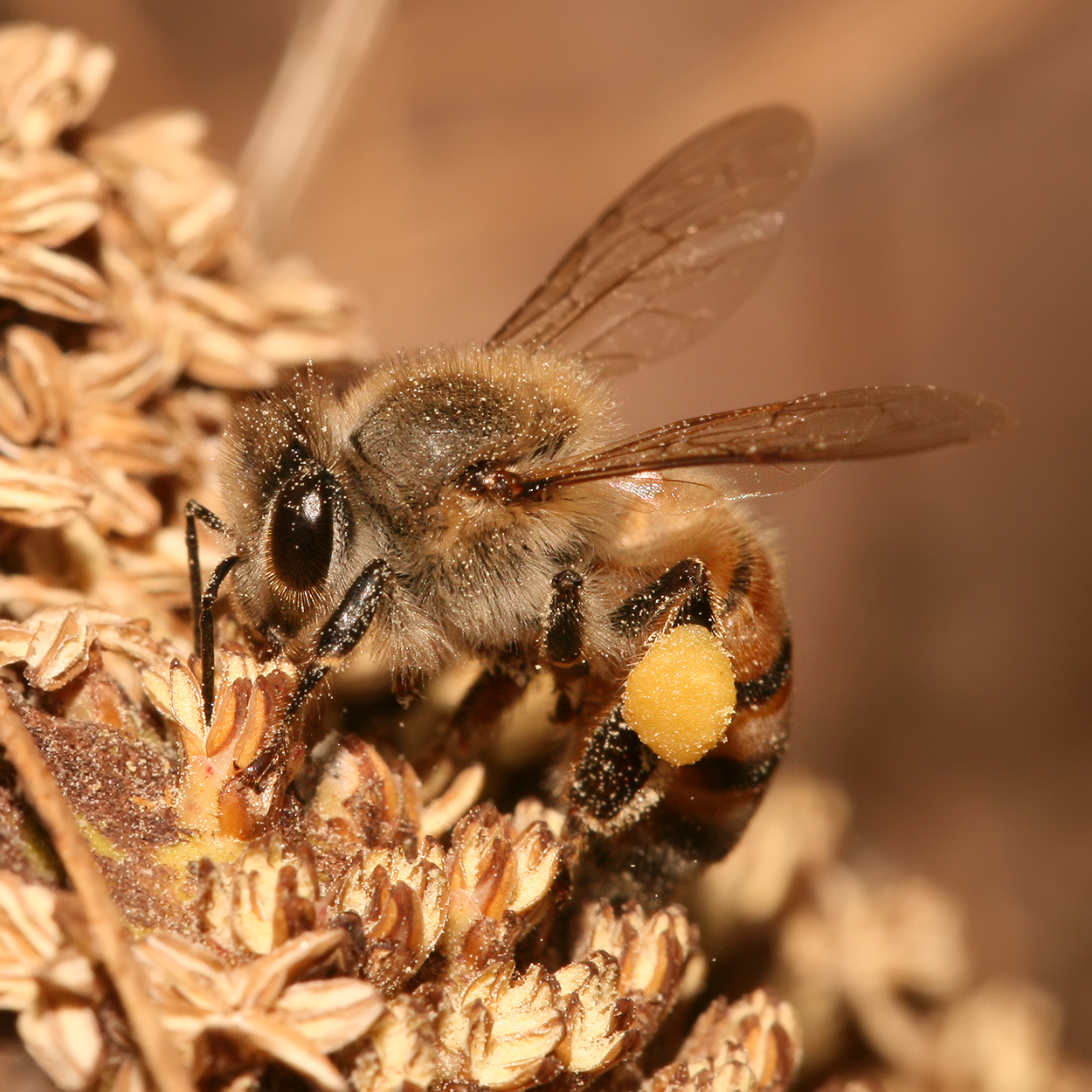
The European honey bee may have originated from eastern Africa. This bee is pictured in Tanzania.

A. mellifera, the most common domesticated species, was first domesticated before 2600 BC and was the third insect to have its genome mapped. It seems to have originated in eastern tropical Africa and spread from there to Europe and eastwards into Asia to the Tian Shan range. It is variously called the European, western, or common honey bee in different parts of the world. Many subspecies have adapted to the local geographic and climatic environments; in addition, breeds such as the Buckfast bee have been bred. Behavior, colour, and anatomy can be quite different from one subspecies or even strain to another.

A. mellifera phylogeny is the most enigmatic of all honey bee species. It seems to have diverged from its eastern relatives only during the Late Miocene. This would fit the hypothesis that the ancestral stock of cave-nesting honey bees was separated into the western group of East Africa and the eastern group of tropical Asia by desertification in the Middle East and adjacent regions, which caused declines of food plants and trees that provided nest sites, eventually causing gene flow to cease.

The diversity of A. mellifera subspecies is probably the product of a largely Early Pleistocene radiation aided by climate and habitat changes during the last ice age. That the western honey bee has been intensively managed by humans for many millennia—including hybridization and introductions—has apparently increased the speed of its evolution and confounded the DNA sequence data to a point where little of substance can be said about the exact relationships of many A. mellifera subspecies.

Apis mellifera is not native to the Americas, so it was not present when the European explorers and colonists arrived. However, other native bee species were kept and traded by indigenous peoples. In 1622, European colonists brought the German honey bee (A. m. mellifera) to the Americas first, followed later by the Italian honey bee (A. m. ligustica) and others. Many of the crops that depend on western honey bees for pollination have also been imported since colonial times. Escaped swarms (known as "wild" honey bees, but actually feral) spread rapidly as far as the Great Plains, usually preceding the colonists. Honey bees did not naturally cross the Rocky Mountains; they were transported by the Mormon pioneers to Utah in the late 1840s, and by ship to California in the early 1850s.

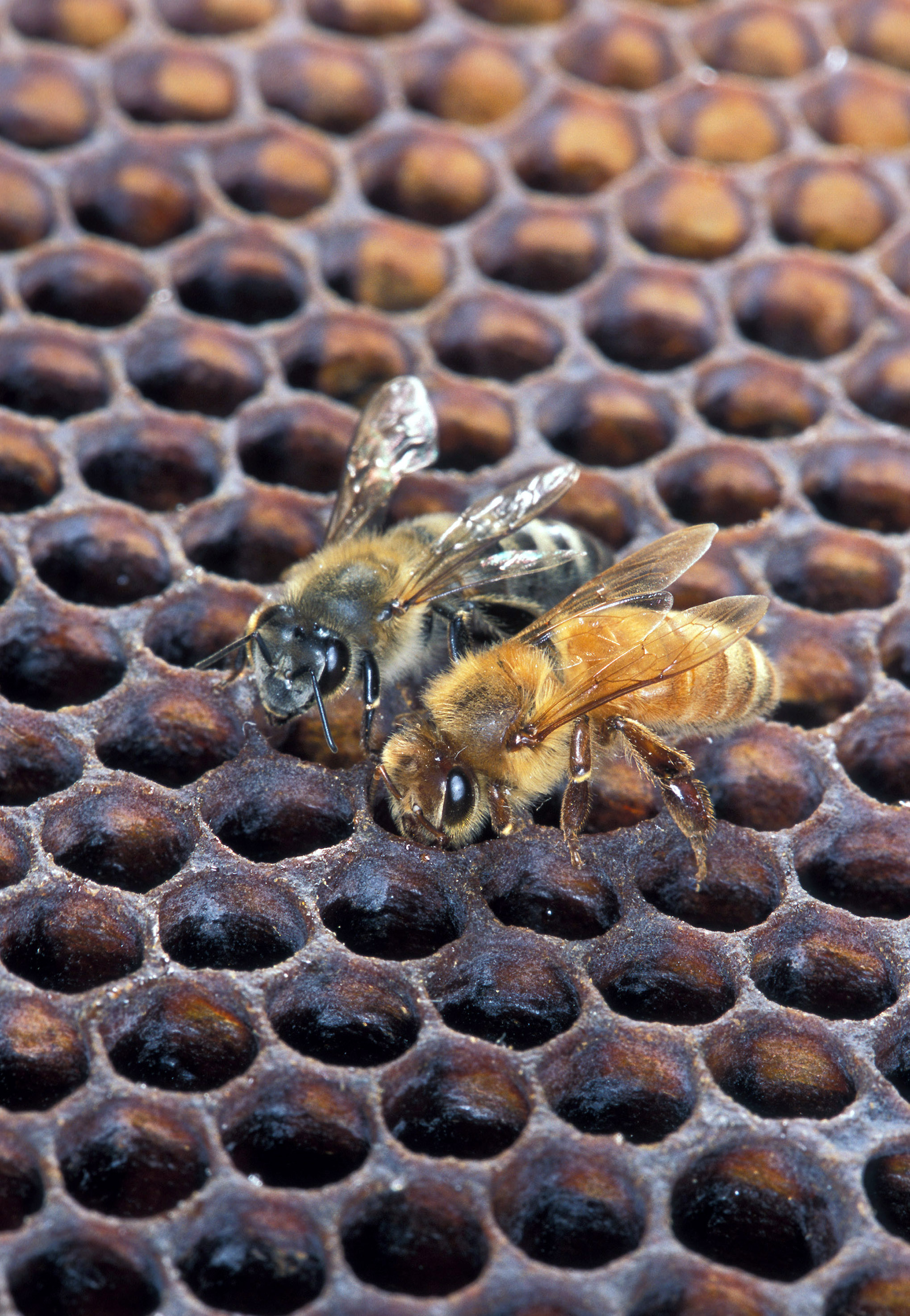
An Africanized honey bee (left) and a European honey bee on a honeycomb

==== Africanized honey bee ====
Africanized honey bees (known colloquially as "killer bees") are hybrids between European stock and the African subspecies A. m. scutellata. They are often more aggressive than European honey bees and do not create as much of a honey surplus, but are more resistant to disease and are better foragers. Accidentally released from quarantine in Brazil, they have spread to North America and constitute a pest in some regions. However, these strains do not overwinter well, so they are not often found in the colder, more northern parts of North America. The original breeding experiment for which the African honey bees were brought to Brazil in the first place has continued (though not as originally intended). Novel hybrid strains of domestic and re-domesticated Africanized honey bees combine high resilience to tropical conditions and good yields. They are popular among beekeepers in Brazil.

== Living and fossil honey bees (Apini: Apis) ==
Tribe Apini Latreille

Genus Apis Linnaeus (sensu lato)

- henshawi species group (†Priorapis Engel, †Synapis Cockerell)
    - †A. vetusta Engel
    - †A. henshawi Cockerell
    - †A. petrefacta (Říha)
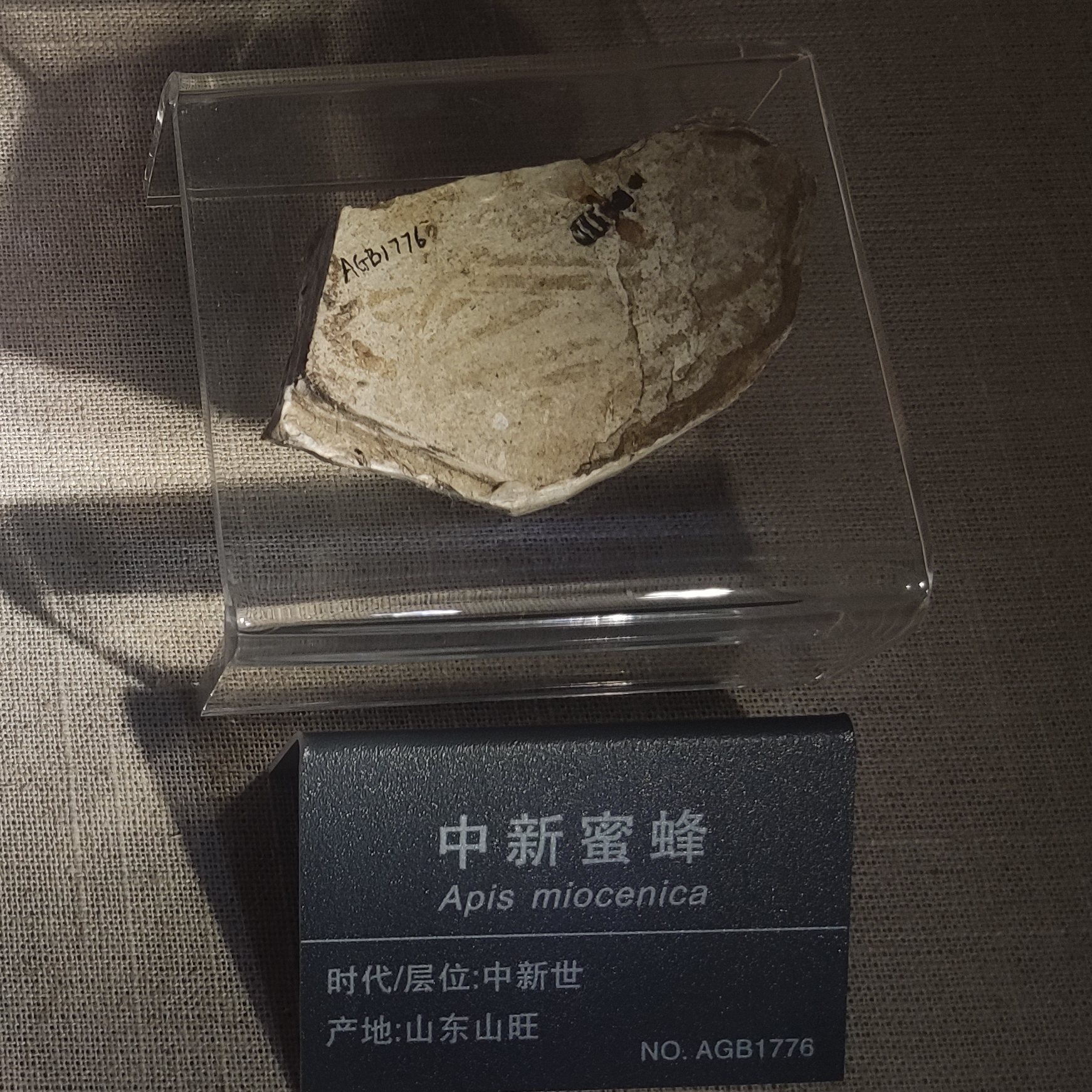
    - †A. miocenica
      †A. miocenica Hong
    - †A. "longtibia" Zhang
    - †A. "Miocene 1"
- armbrusteri species group (†Cascapis Engel)
    - †A. armbrusteri Zeuner
    - †A. nearctica, species novus
- florea species group (Micrapis Ashmead)
    - A. florea Fabricius
    - A. andreniformis Smith
- dorsata species group (Megapis Ashmead)
    - †A. lithohermaea Engel
    - A. dorsata Fabricius
    - A. laboriosa Smith
- mellifera species group (Apis Linnaeus sensu stricto)
  - mellifera subgroup
    - A. mellifera Linnaeus (Apis Linnaeus sensu strictissimo)
  - cerana subgroup (Sigmatapis Maa)
    - †A. antejaponica Engel & Tanaka
    - A. cerana Fabricius
    - A. nigrocincta Smith
    - A. koschevnikovi Enderlein

== Life cycle ==
As in a few other types of eusocial bees, a colony generally contains one queen bee, a female; seasonally up to a few thousand drone bees, or males; and tens of thousands of female worker bees. Details vary among the different species of honey bees, but common features include:

1. Eggs are laid singly in a cell in a wax honeycomb, produced and shaped by the worker bees. Using her spermatheca, the queen can choose to fertilize the egg she is laying, usually depending on which cell she is laying it into. Drones develop from unfertilised eggs and are haploid, while females (queens and worker bees) develop from fertilised eggs and are diploid. Larvae are initially fed with royal jelly produced by worker bees, later switching to honey and pollen. The exception is a larva fed solely on royal jelly, which will develop into a queen bee. The larva undergoes several moultings before spinning a cocoon within the cell, and pupating.
2. Young worker bees, sometimes called "nurse bees", clean the hive and feed the larvae. When their royal jelly-producing glands begin to atrophy, they begin building comb cells. They progress to other within-colony tasks as they become older, such as receiving nectar and pollen from foragers and guarding the hive. Later still, a worker takes her first orientation flight and finally leaves the hive and typically spends the remainder of her life as a forager.
3. Worker bees cooperate to find food and use a pattern of "dancing" (known as the bee dance or waggle dance) to communicate information regarding resources with each other; this dance varies from species to species, but all living species of Apis exhibit some form of the behavior. If the resources are very close to the hive, they may also exhibit a less specific dance commonly known as the "round dance".
4. Honey bees also perform tremble dances, which recruit receiver bees to collect nectar from returning foragers.
5. Virgin queens go on mating flights away from their home colony to a drone congregation area and mate with multiple drones before returning. The drones die in the act of mating. Queen honey bees do not mate with drones from their home colony.
6. Colonies are established not by solitary queens, as in most bees, but by groups known as "swarms", which consist of a mated queen and a large contingent of worker bees. This group moves en masse to a nest site that was scouted by worker bees beforehand and whose location is communicated with a special type of dance. Once the swarm arrives, they immediately construct a new wax comb and begin to raise a new worker brood. This type of nest founding is not seen in any other living bee genus, though several groups of vespid wasps also found new nests by swarming (sometimes including multiple queens). Also, stingless bees will start new nests with large numbers of worker bees, but the nest is constructed before a queen is escorted to the site, and this worker force is not a true "swarm".

=== Gallery ===
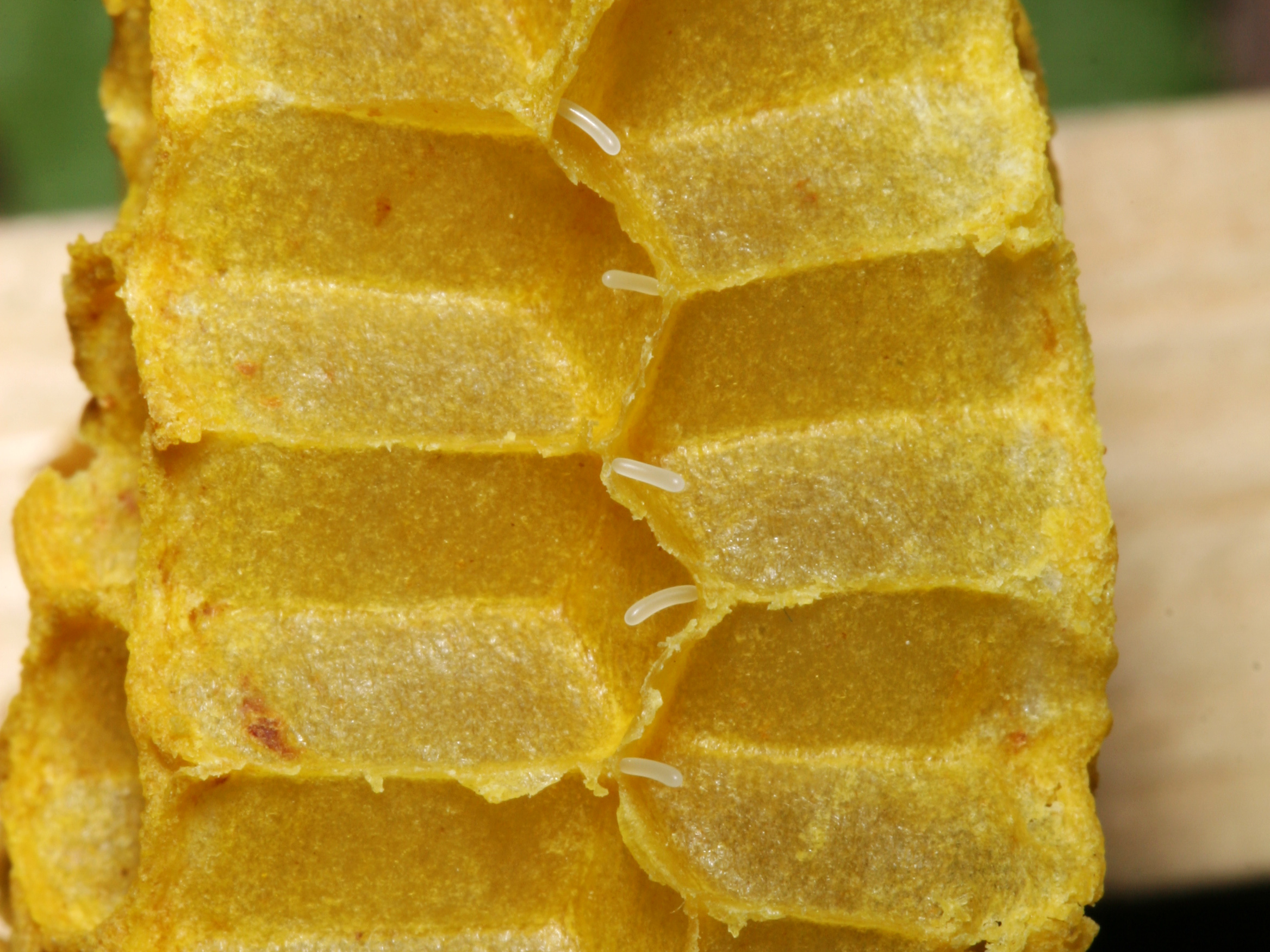
Honey bee eggs shown in opened wax cells

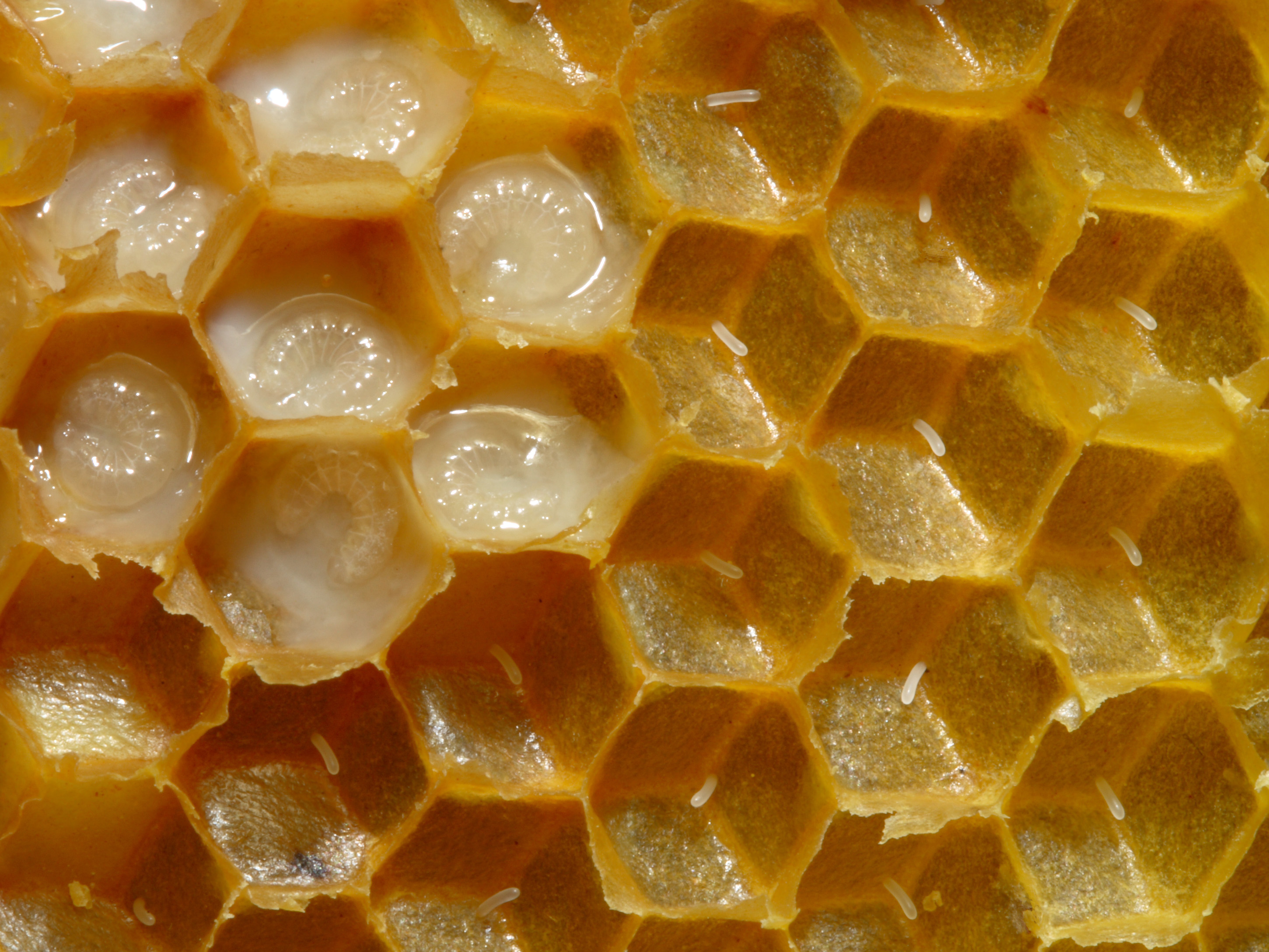
Eggs and larvae

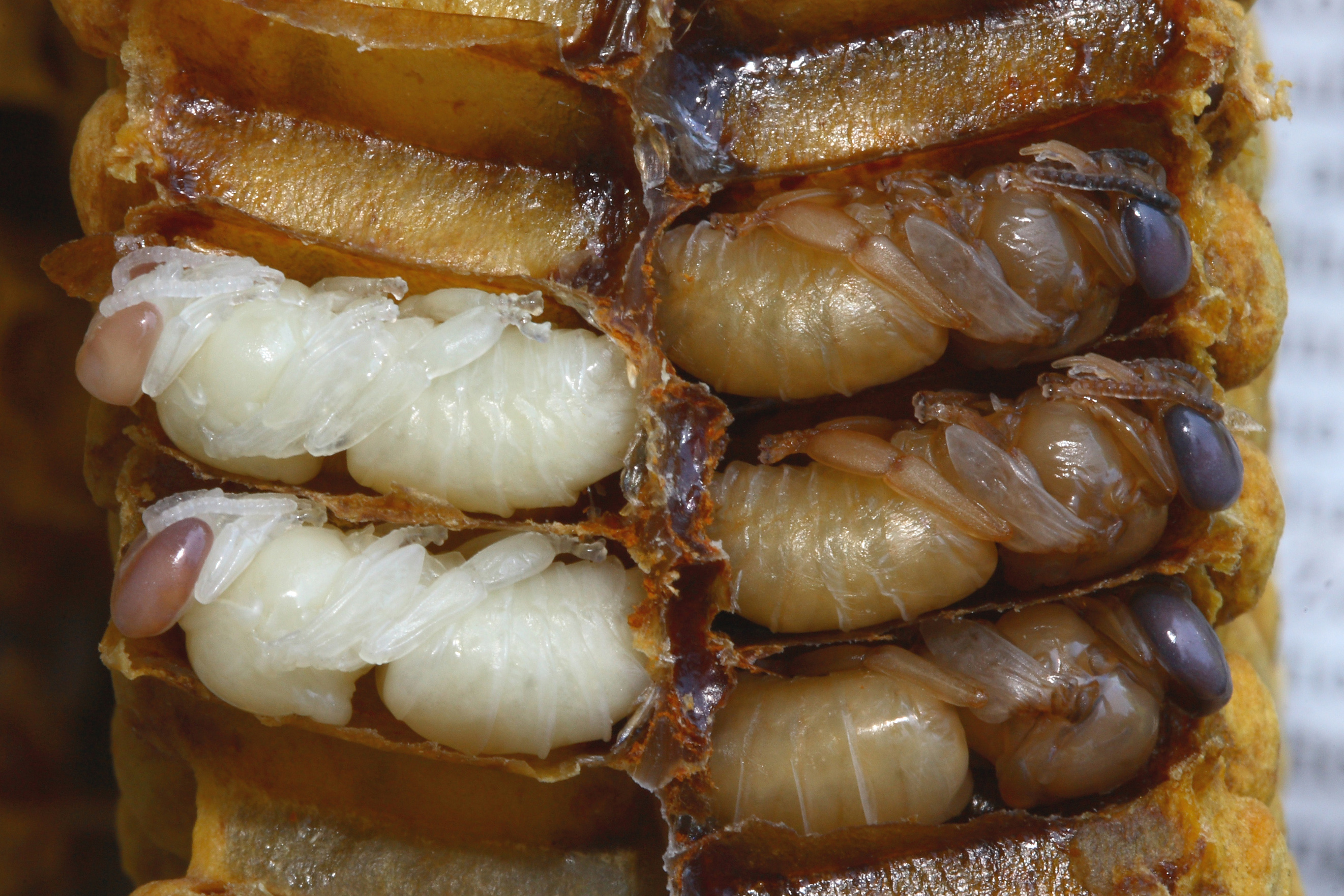
Drone pupae

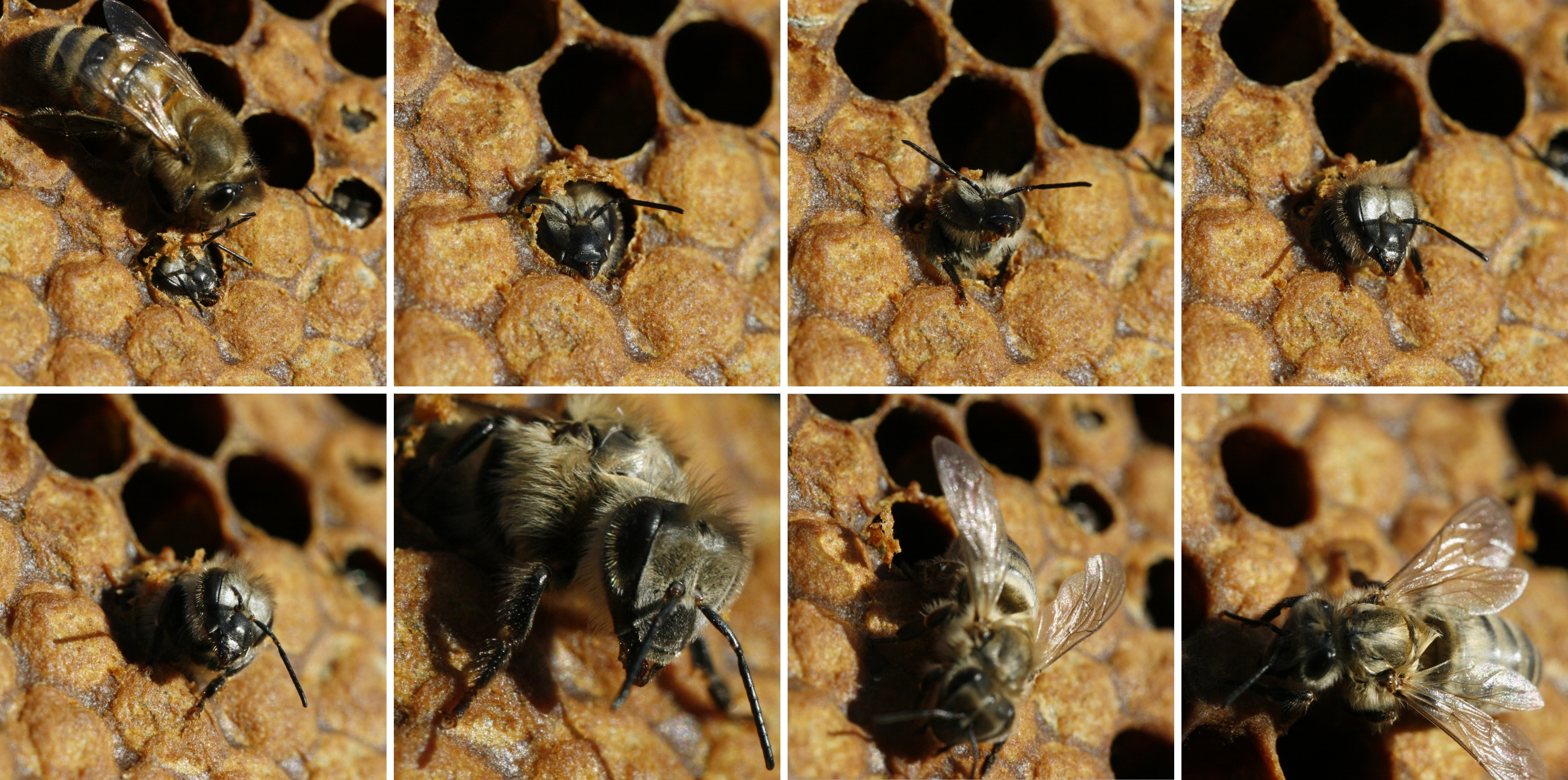
Emergence of a European dark honey bee (A. m. mellifera)

Honey bee on Geranium (cultivar Rozanne) and flying. Second portion shown at 12,000 frames per second with 60 frames shown per second

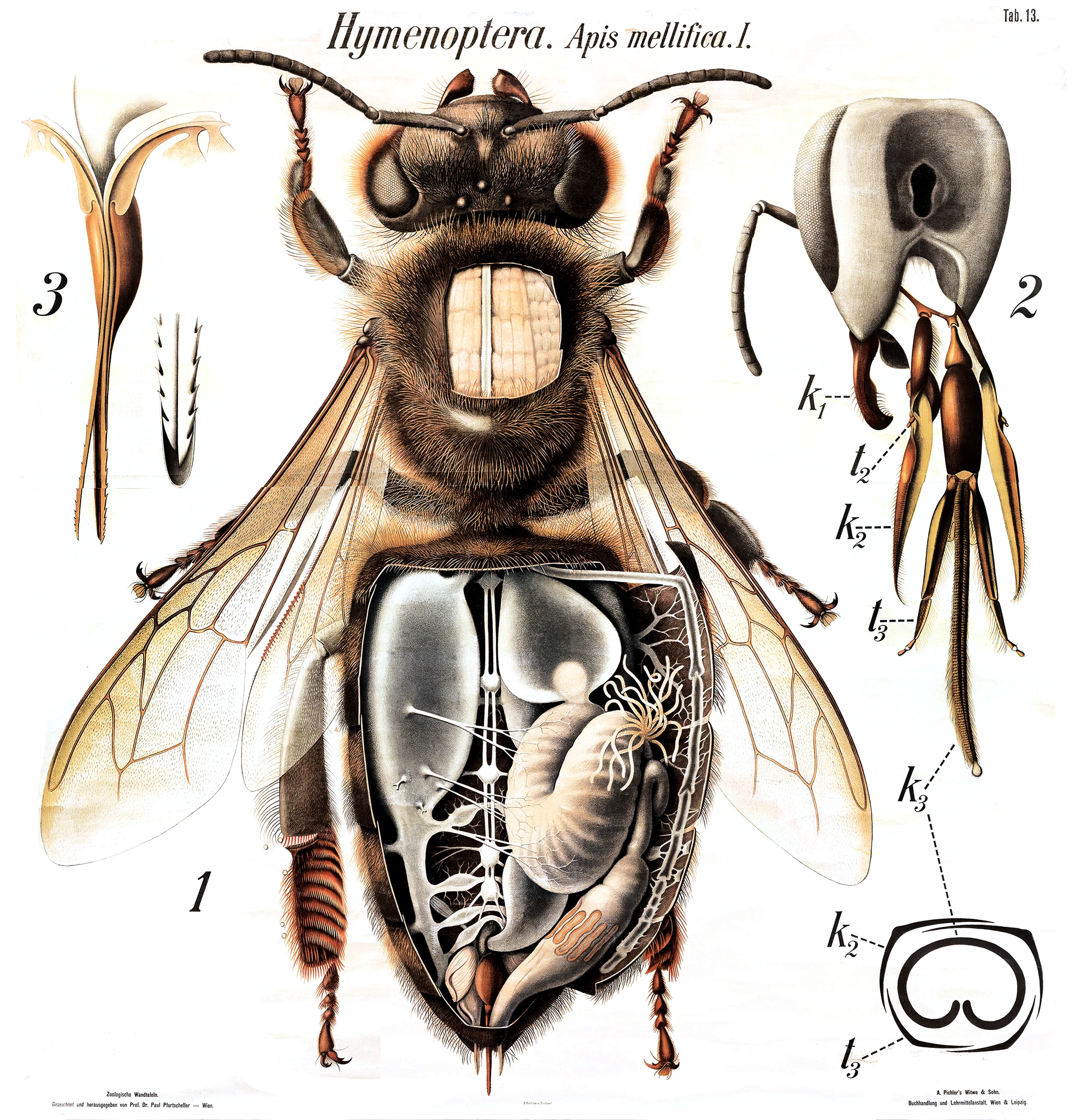
Honey bee anatomy

=== Winter survival ===
In cold climates, honey bees stop flying when the temperature drops below about 10 °C (50 °F) and crowd into the central area of the hive to form a "winter cluster". The worker bees huddle around the queen bee at the center of the cluster, shivering to keep the center between 27 °C (81 °F) at the start of winter (during the broodless period) and 34 °C (93 °F) once the queen resumes laying. The worker bees rotate through the cluster from the outside to the inside so that no bee gets too cold. The outside edges of the cluster stay at about 8–9 °C (46–48 °F). The colder the weather is outside, the more compact the cluster becomes. During winter, they consume their stored honey to produce body heat. The amount of honey consumed during the winter is a function of winter length and severity but ranges in temperate climates from 15 to 50 kilograms (33 to 110 lb). In addition, certain bees, including the western honey bee as well as Apis cerana, are known to engage in effective methods of nest thermoregulation during periods of varying temperature in both summer and winter. During the summer, however, this is achieved through fanning and water evaporation from water collected in various fields.

== Pollination ==
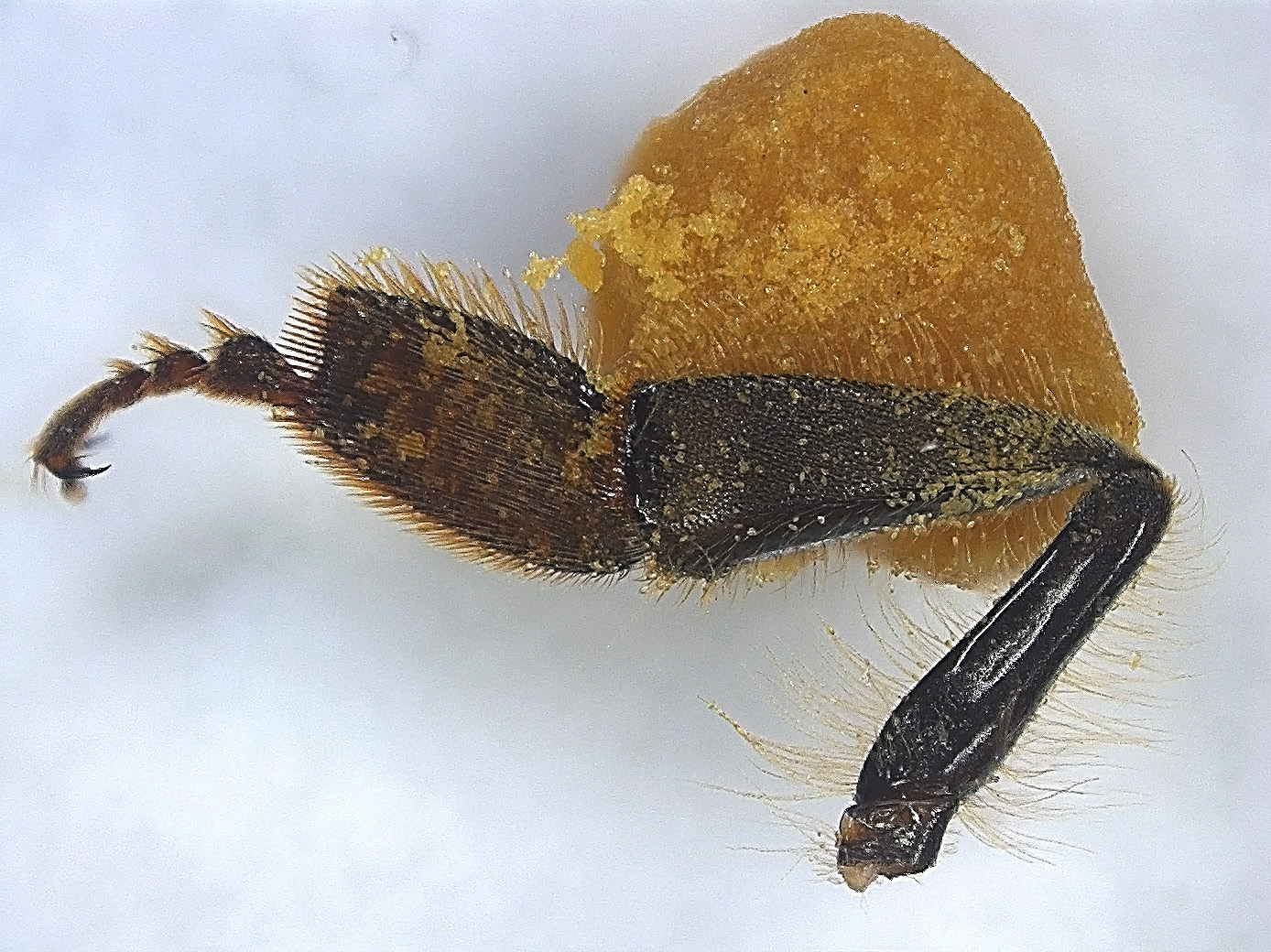
Hind leg of a honey bee with pollen pellet stuck on the pollen basket or corbicula. When the worker bee is collecting pollen, their legs make the transfer of pollen from the inner basitarsal combs to the outer pollen basket (shown in the figure).

Buzzing bees on the flowering plum

Of all the honey bee species, only A. mellifera has been used extensively for commercial pollination of fruit and vegetable crops. The scale of these pollination services is commonly measured in the billions of dollars, credited with adding about 9% to the value of crops across the world. However, despite contributing substantially to crop pollination, there is debate about the potential spillover to natural landscapes and competition between managed honey bees and many of the ~20,000 species of wild pollinators.

Species of Apis are generalist floral visitors, and pollinate many species of flowering plants, but because of their "generalized" nature, they often do so inefficiently. Without specialized adaptations for specific flowers, their ability to reach pollen and nectar is often limited. This combined with their behavioural flexibility may be why they are the most commonly documented pollen thieves. Indeed, for plant species with more specialized pollinators, experiments show that increased honeybee visitation can reduce pollination, both where honey bees are non-native and even where they are native. They can provide some pollination to many plants, but some plants have a native pollinator that is more effective at pollinating that species. When honey bees are present as an invasive species in an area, they compete for flowers with native pollinators, which can actually push out the native species.

=== Claims of human dependency ===
Western honey bees have been described as essential to human food production, leading to claims that without their pollination humanity would starve or die out. Apples, blueberries, and cherries, for example, are 90 percent dependent on honeybee pollination. Albert Einstein is sometimes misquoted as saying "If bees disappeared off the face of the earth, man would only have four years left to live". Einstein did not say this and there is no science to support this prediction.

Many important crops need no insect pollination at all. The ten most important crops, comprising 60% of all human food energy, fall into this category: plantains are sterile and propagated by cuttings, as are cassava; potatoes, yams, and sweet potatoes are root vegetables propagated by tubers; soybeans are self-pollinated; and rice, wheat, sorghum, and maize, are wind-pollinated, as are most other grasses.

No crops originating in the New World depend on the western honey bee (Apis mellifera) at all, as the bee is an invasive species brought over with colonists in the last few centuries. Tomatoes, peppers, squash, and all other New World crops evolved with native pollinators such as squash bees, bumble bees, and other native bees. The stingless bees mentioned by Jefferson are distant relatives of the honey bees, in the genus Melipona.

Still, honey bees are considered "crucial to the food supply, pollinating more than 100 of the crops we eat, including nuts, vegetables, berries, citrus and melons." The USDA reports "Three-fourths of the world's flowering plants and about 35 percent of the world's food crops depend on animal pollinators to reproduce" and honey bees "pollinate 80 percent of all flowering plants, including more than 130 types of fruits and vegetables."

== Nutrition ==
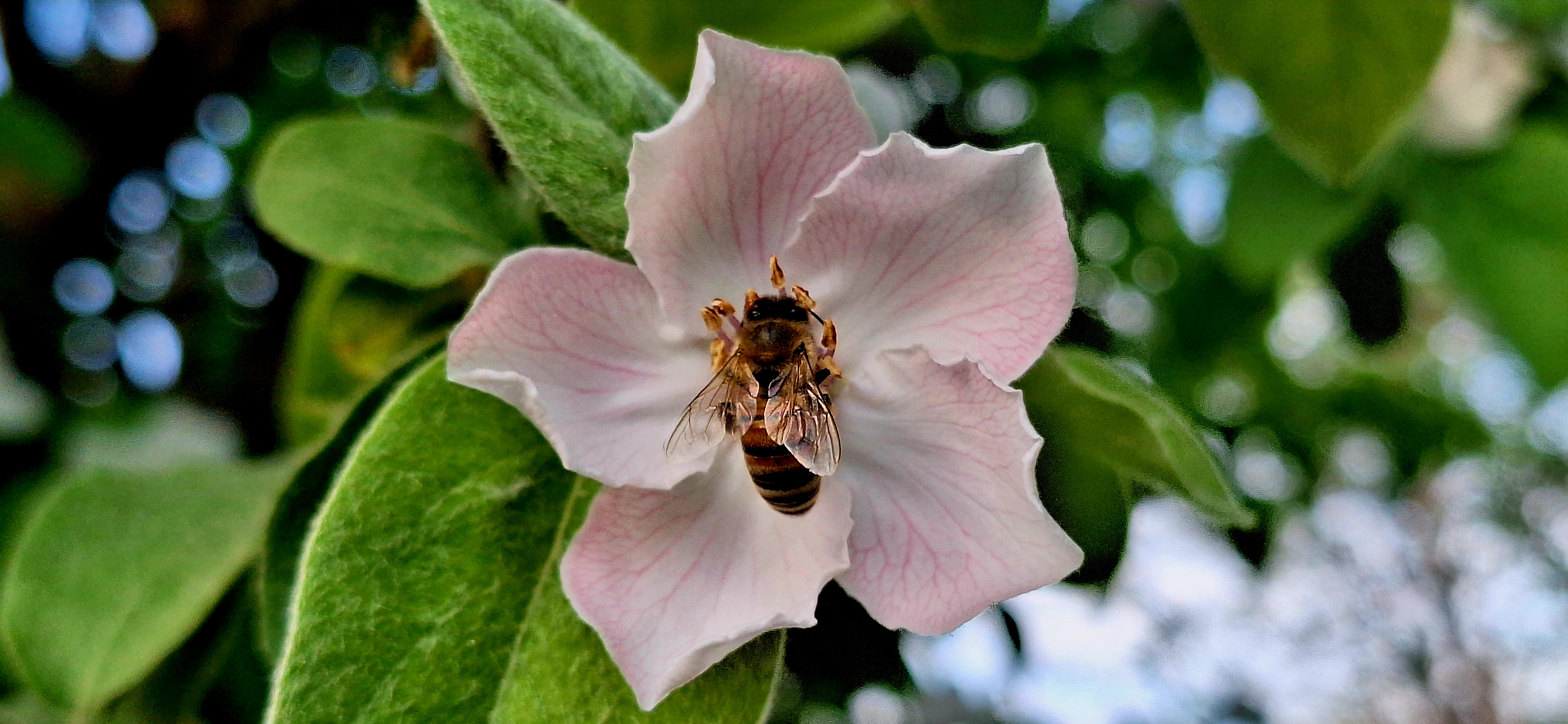
A honey bee forager on a quince flower

Honey bees obtain all of their nutritional requirements from a diverse combination of pollen and nectar. Pollen is the only natural protein source for honey bees. Adult worker honey bees consume 3.4–4.3 mg of pollen per day to meet a dry matter requirement of 66–74% protein. The rearing of one larva requires 125-187.5 mg pollen or 25–37.5 mg protein for proper development. Dietary proteins are broken down into amino acids, ten of which are considered essential to honey bees: methionine, tryptophan, arginine, lysine, histidine, phenylalanine, isoleucine, threonine, leucine, and valine. Of these amino acids, honey bees require the highest concentrations of leucine, isoleucine, and valine; however, elevated concentrations of arginine and lysine are required for brood rearing. In addition to these amino acids, some B vitamins including biotin, folic acid, nicotinamide, riboflavin, thiamine, pantothenate, and most importantly, pyridoxine are required to rear larvae. Pyridoxine is the most prevalent B vitamin found in royal jelly and concentrations vary throughout the foraging season with the lowest concentrations found in May and the highest concentrations found in July and August. Honey bees lacking dietary pyridoxine were unable to rear brood.

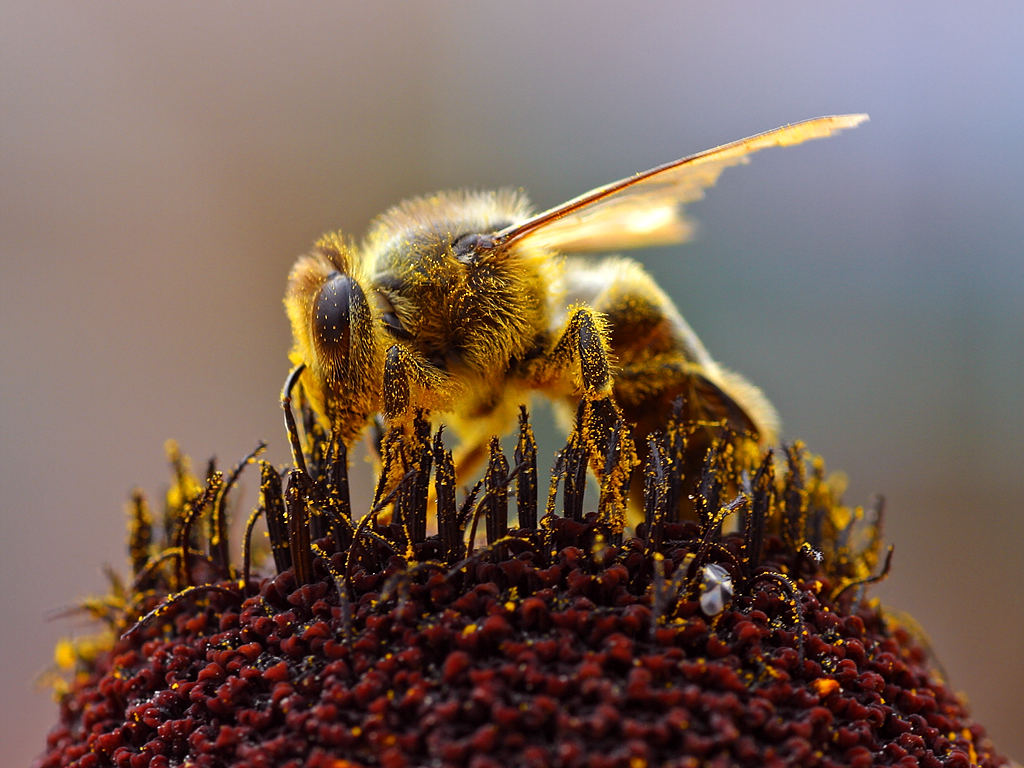
A forager collecting pollen

Pollen is also a lipid source for honey bees ranging from 0.8% to 18.9%. Lipids are metabolized during the brood stage for precursors required for future biosynthesis. Fat-soluble vitamins A, D, E, and K are not considered essential but have been shown to significantly improve the number of brood reared. Honey bees ingest phytosterols from pollen to produce 24-methylene cholesterol and other sterols as they cannot directly synthesize cholesterol from phytosterols. Nurse bees can selectively transfer sterols to larvae through brood food.

Nectar is collected by foraging worker bees as a source of water and carbohydrates in the form of sucrose. The dominant monosaccharides in honey bee diets are fructose and glucose but the most common circulating sugar in hemolymph is trehalose which is a disaccharide consisting of two glucose molecules. Adult worker honey bees require 4 mg of utilizable sugars per day and larvae require about 59.4 mg of carbohydrates for proper development.

Honey bees require water to maintain osmotic homeostasis, prepare liquid brood food, and cool the hive through evaporation. A colony's water needs can generally be met by nectar foraging as it has high water content. Occasionally on hot days or when nectar is limited, foragers will collect water from streams or ponds to meet the needs of the hive.

== Beekeeping ==
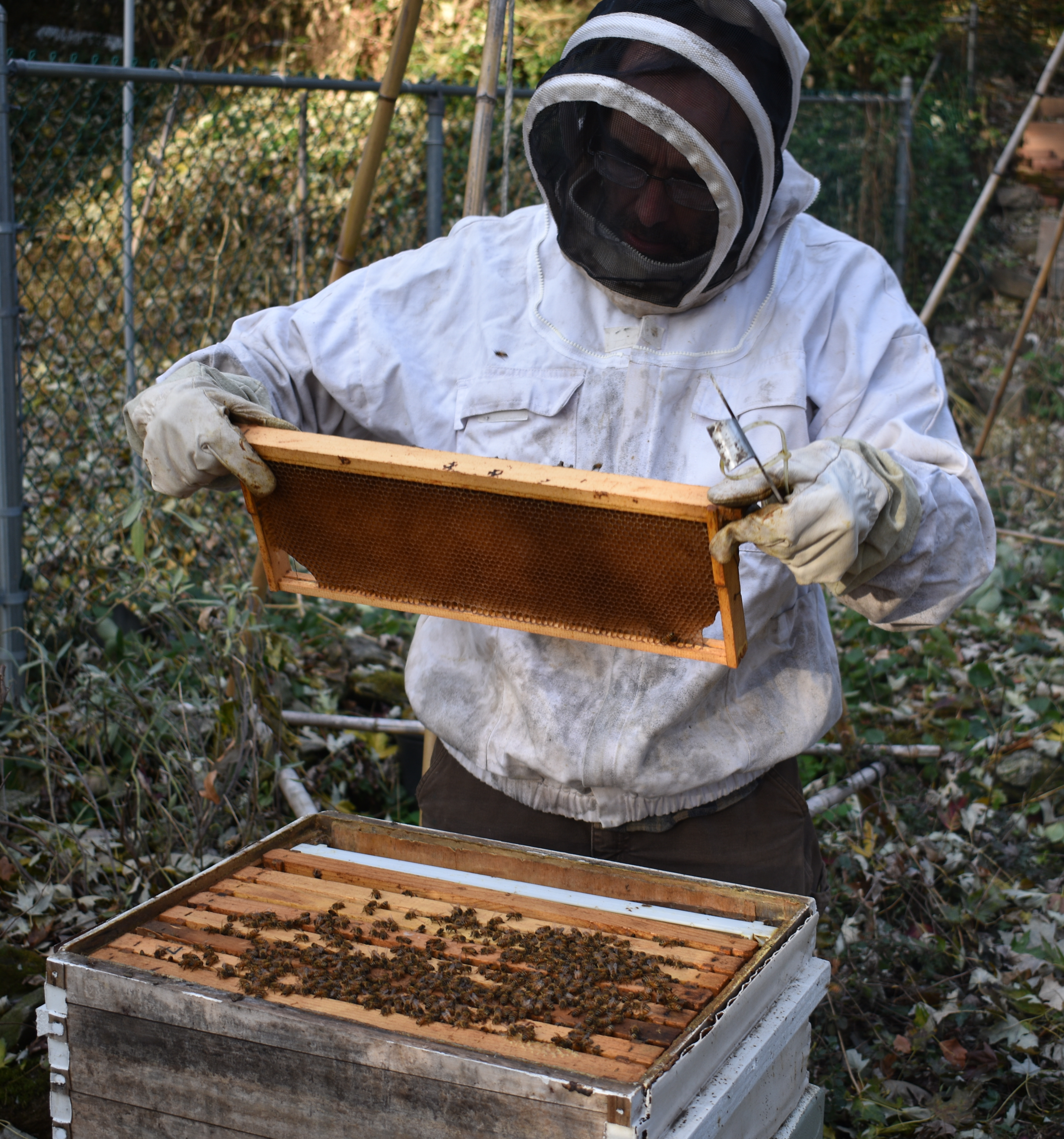
A beekeeper inspecting a hive frame from a Langstroth hive. The modular design allows for easier management and honey harvesting.

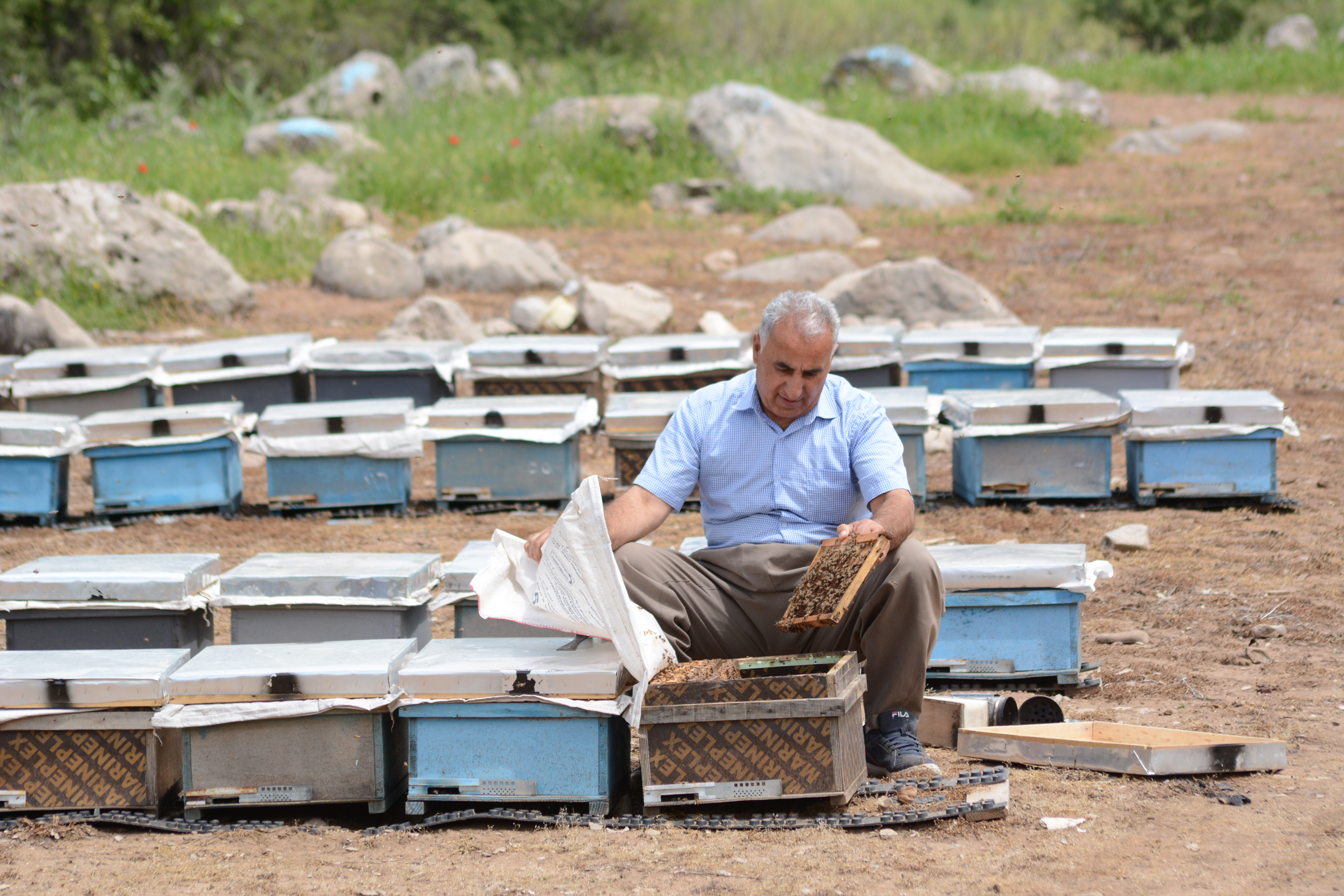
A professional beekeeper inspects hives for breeding and selection, Pendro.

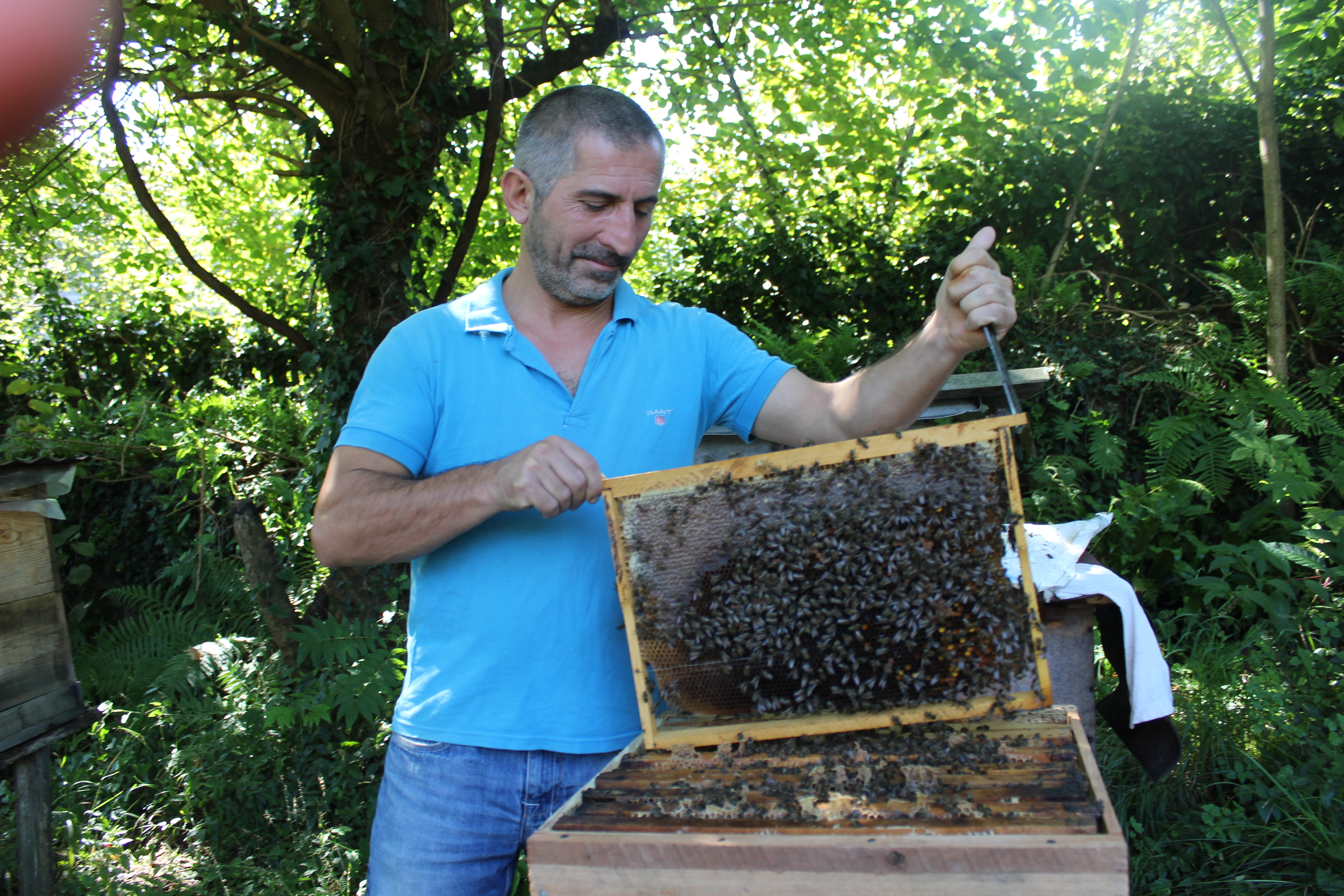
A professional beekeeper from Guria inspects a well-developed jumbo frame hive.

Honey bee hive entrance with audio. The last part is at one-fourth speed.

The only domesticated species of honey bee are A. mellifera and A. cerana, and they are often maintained, fed, and transported by beekeepers. In Japan, where A. mellifera is vulnerable to local hornets and disease, the Japanese honey bee A. cerana japonica is used in its place. Modern hives also enable beekeepers to transport bees, moving from field to field as the crop needs pollinating and allowing the beekeeper to charge for the pollination services they provide, revising the historical role of the self-employed beekeeper, and favoring large-scale commercial operations. Bees of various types other than honey bees are also domesticated and used for pollination or other means around the world, including Tetragonula iridipennis in India, the blue orchard bee for tree nut and fruit pollination in the United States, and several species of Bombus (bumblebees) for pollination in various regions globally, such as tomatoes, which are not effectively pollinated by honey bees.

=== Colony collapse disorder ===
Primarily in places where western honey bees were imported by humans, periodic collapses in western honey bee populations have occurred at least since the late 19th century.

However, as humans continued to manipulate the western honey bee and deliberately transferred them on a global scale, diseases simultaneously spread and harmed managed colonies. Colony losses have occurred periodically throughout history. Fungus, mites, and starvation have all been thought to be the cause of the deaths. Limited occurrences resembling CCD were documented as early as 1869. Colony collapses were called "May Disease" in Colorado in 1891 and 1896.

Starting in the first decade of the 21st century, abnormally high die-offs (30–70% of hives) of western honey bee colonies have occurred in North America. This has been dubbed "colony collapse disorder" (CCD) and was at first unexplained. It seems to be caused by a combination of factors rather than a single pathogen or poison, possibly including neonicotinoid pesticides or Israeli acute paralysis virus.

A survey by the University of Maryland and Auburn University published in 2023 found the number of United States honeybee colonies "remained relatively stable" although 48% of colonies were lost in the year that ended April 1, 2023, with a 12-year average annual mortality rate of 39.6%. The previous year (2021–2022) the loss was 39% and the 2020–2021 loss was 50.8%. Beekeepers told the surveying scientists that a 21% loss over the winter is acceptable and more than three-fifths of beekeepers surveyed said their losses were higher than that in 2022–2023.

=== Parasites ===
==== Acarapis woodi ====
Acarapis woodi (or "tracheal mites") are parasitic mites that live and reproduce in adult bees' tracheae, or respiratory tubes, piercing the tube walls with their mouthparts to feed on haemolymph. To infest new hosts, the mites must find newly emerged bees; after three days, the bristles (setae) guarding the spiracles are firm enough to prevent the mites' entry into the tracheae. Mite infestations are known as acarine and have been called "Isle of Wight disease".

==== Galleria mellonella ====
Larval stages of the moth Galleria mellonella parasitize both wild and cultivated honey bees, in particular Apis mellifera and Apis cerana. Eggs are laid within the hive and the larvae that hatch tunnel through and destroy the honeycombs that contain bee larva and their honey stores. The tunnels they create are lined with silk, which entangles and starves emerging bees. Destruction of honeycombs also results in honey leaking and being wasted. Both G. mellonella adults and larvae are possible vectors for pathogens that can infect bees, including the Israeli acute paralysis virus and the black queen cell virus.

To manage the mites, temperature treatments are possible, but also distort the wax of the honeycombs. Chemical fumigants, particularly CO_{2}, are also used.

==== Varroa mites ====
Varroa mites are arguably the biggest threat to honey bees in the United States. These mites invade hives and reproduce by laying eggs on the pupa. The hatching mites eat away at the pupa, causing deformities as well as spreading disease. If not detected and treated early on, the mite population may increase to such an extent that the hive will succumb to the diseases and deformities caused by the mites. It was widely believed that the mites drank the blood of bees. However, a 2018 study Article in PNAS: "Linking pesticides and gut health in bees" showed that they feed on the fat body tissue of live bees, not the blood.

Mite treatment is accomplished by several methods, including treatment strips and acid vaporization.

== Bee products ==
=== Honey ===
Honey is a complex substance made when bees ingest nectar, process it, and store the substance in honeycombs. All living species of Apis have had their honey gathered by indigenous peoples for consumption. A. mellifera and A. cerana are the only species that have had their honey harvested for commercial purposes.

=== Beeswax ===
Worker bees of a certain age secrete beeswax from a series of exocrine glands on their abdomens. They use the wax to form the walls and caps of the comb. As with honey, beeswax is gathered by humans for various purposes such as candle making, waterproofing, soap and cosmetics manufacturing, pharmaceuticals, art, furniture polish, and more.

=== Bee bread ===
Bees collect pollen in their pollen baskets called corbiculae and carry it back to the hive.

Worker bees combine pollen, honey, and glandular secretions and allow them to ferment in the comb to make bee bread. The fermentation process releases additional nutrients from the pollen and can produce antibiotics and fatty acids which inhibit spoilage. Bee bread is eaten by nurse bees (younger workers) which produce the protein-rich royal jelly needed by the queen and developing larvae in their hypopharyngeal glands.

In the hive, pollen is used as a protein source necessary during brood-rearing. In certain environments, excess pollen can be collected from the hives of A. mellifera and A. cerana. The product is used as a health supplement. It has been used with moderate success as a source of pollen for hand pollination.

=== Bees as food ===
Bee brood—the eggs, larvae or pupae of honey bees—is nutritious and seen as a delicacy in countries such as Indonesia, Mexico, Thailand, and many African countries; it has been consumed since ancient times by the Chinese and Egyptians. (Note: The Mayans kept and collected honey and brood, but from stingless social bees such as Melipona beecheii, not from Apis honeybees.)

Adult wild honeybees are also consumed as food in parts of China, including Yunnan. According to a worker at a Yunnan-based specialty restaurant, the bees are best served "deep-fried with salt and pepper", and they are "naturally sweet and tasty". Kellie Schmitt of CNN described the dish as one of "Shanghai's weirdest foods".

=== Propolis ===
Propolis is a resinous mixture collected by honey bees from tree buds, sap flows, or other botanical sources, which is used as a sealant for unwanted open spaces in the hive. Propolis may cause severe allergic reactions and have adverse interactions with prescription drugs in some individuals. Propolis is also used in wood finishes on string instruments.

=== Royal jelly ===
Royal jelly is a honey bee secretion made in the hypopharyngeal and mandibular glands of nurse bees used to nourish larvae and queen bees. It is marketed for its alleged but unsupported claims of health benefits. On the other hand, it may cause severe allergic reactions in some individuals.

== Sexes and castes ==
Honey bees have three castes: drones, workers, and queens. Drones are male, while workers and queens are female.

=== Drones ===
Honey bees have a haplodiploid system of sex determination.

Drones are typically haploid, having only one set of chromosomes, and primarily exist for reproduction. They are produced by the queen if she chooses not to fertilize an egg or by an unfertilized laying worker. There are rare instances of diploid drone larvae. This phenomenon usually arises when there are more than two generations of brother-sister mating. Sex determination in honey bees is initially due to a single locus, called the complementary sex determiner (csd) gene. In developing bees, if the conditions are that the individual is heterozygous for the csd gene, they will develop into females. If the conditions are so that the individual is hemizygous or homozygous for the csd gene, they will develop into males. The instances where the individual is homozygous at this gene are the instances of diploid males. Drones take 24 days to develop and may be produced from summer through to autumn, numbering as many as 500 per hive. They are expelled from the hive during the winter months when the hive's primary focus is warmth and food conservation. Drones have large eyes used to locate queens during mating flights. They do not defend the hive or kill intruders and do not have a stinger.

=== Workers ===
Worker bees have two sets of chromosomes. They are produced from an egg that the queen has selectively fertilized from stored sperm. Workers typically develop in 21 days. A typical colony may contain as many as 60,000 worker bees. Workers exhibit a wider range of behaviors than either queens or drones. Their duties change with age in the following order (beginning with cleaning out their cell after eating through their capped brood cell): feed brood, receive nectar, clean hive, guard duty, and forage. Some workers engage in other specialized behaviors, such as "undertaking" (removing corpses of their nestmates from inside the hive).

Workers have morphological specializations, including the pollen basket (corbicula), abdominal glands that produce beeswax, brood-feeding glands, and barbs on the sting. Under certain conditions (for example, if the colony becomes queenless), a worker may develop ovaries.

Worker honey bees perform different behavioural tasks that cause them to be exposed to different local environments. The gut microbial composition of workers varies according to the landscape and plant species they forage, such as differences in rapeseed crops, and with different hive tasks, such as nursing or food processing.

=== Queens ===
Queen honey bees are created when worker bees feed a single female larva an exclusive diet of a food called "royal jelly". Queens are produced in oversized cells and develop in only 16 days; they differ in physiology, morphology, and behavior from worker bees. In addition to the greater size of the queen, she has a functional set of ovaries, and a spermatheca, which stores and maintains sperm after she has mated. Apis queens practice polyandry, with one female mating with multiple males. The highest documented mating frequency for an Apis queen is in Apis nigrocincta, where queens mate with an extremely high number of males with observed numbers of different matings ranging from 42 to 69 drones per queen. The sting of queens is not barbed like a worker's sting, and queens lack the glands that produce beeswax. Once mated, queens may lay up to 2,000 eggs per day. They produce a variety of pheromones that regulate the behavior of workers and help swarms track the queen's location during the swarming.

=== Queen-worker conflict ===
When a fertile female worker produces drones, a conflict arises between her interests and those of the queen. The worker shares half her genes with the drone and one-quarter with her brothers, favouring her offspring over those of the queen. The queen shares half her genes with her sons and one-quarter with the sons of fertile female workers. This pits the worker against the queen and other workers, who try to maximize their reproductive fitness by rearing the offspring most related to them. This relationship leads to a phenomenon known as "worker policing". In these rare situations, other worker bees in the hive who are genetically more related to the queen's sons than those of the fertile workers will patrol the hive and remove worker-laid eggs. Another form of worker-based policing is aggression toward fertile females. Some studies have suggested a queen pheromone which may help workers distinguish worker- and queen-laid eggs, but others indicate egg viability as the key factor in eliciting the behavior. Worker policing is an example of forced altruism, where the benefits of worker reproduction are minimized and that of rearing the queen's offspring maximized.

In very rare instances workers subvert the policing mechanisms of the hive, laying eggs which are removed at a lower rate by other workers; this is known as anarchic syndrome. Anarchic workers can activate their ovaries at a higher rate and contribute a greater proportion of males to the hive. Although an increase in the number of drones would decrease the overall productivity of the hive, the reproductive fitness of the drones' mother would increase. The anarchic syndrome is an example of selection working in opposite directions at the individual and group levels for the stability of the hive.

Under ordinary circumstances, the death (or removal) of a queen increases reproduction in workers, and a significant proportion of workers will have active ovaries in the absence of a queen. The workers of the hive produce the last batch of drones before the hive eventually collapses. Although during this period worker policing is usually absent, in certain groups of bees it continues.

According to the strategy of kin selection, worker policing is not favored if a queen does not mate multiple times. Workers would be related by three-quarters of their genes, and the difference in relationship between the sons of the queen and those of the other workers would decrease. The benefit of policing is negated, and policing is less favored. Experiments confirming this hypothesis have shown a correlation between higher mating rates and increased rates of worker policing in many species of social hymenoptera.

== Timeline of reproduction ==
For Apis mellifera, queens are the central reproducers among their colonies. Although reproduction may occur around the calendar, it may stop in the late fall due to falling temperatures. If a colony does not have a queen or she is unable to reproduce, workers can lay unfertilized eggs that may develop into males. The queens, however, do not reach this point immediately. Typically, it takes a queen 16 days to reach adulthood, with an additional week to begin developing and laying eggs. To begin the process of reproduction in a honeybee colony, workers begin to produce queen larvae while simultaneously finding a place to create a new hive. The queen larvae will then hatch at the old hive, and the queens will fight one another until there is only a single queen left to begin reproducing.

== Reproductive strategies ==
Once a queen matures and is ready to begin reproducing, she will begin making flights to orient to mating in free flight and finding mates before actually beginning to mate. Queens that are ready to mate take between 1 and 6 flights across multiple consecutive days, called nuptial flights. Throughout their nuptial flights, queens engage with multiple mates and have little control over the number of times they do so.

The process of queens engaging with their mates is not widely understood because the process takes place in free flight, so it is difficult to observe despite various advances in technology and observation techniques. It begins with drones flying in the same area where they know the queen will soon arrive, waiting for her to join them. When the queen arrives, she is crowded immediately by the drones who are eager to mate with her. The drones receive a signal from the queen that her "sting chamber" is open, which induces the drones to mate with her and bring forward their physical contact which warrants reproduction. A successful drone clasps onto the queen and releases seminal fluid and spermatozoa into the queen. After this process is complete, the drone typically remains inside of the queen, which is indicative of the drone's desire to deter other drones from engaging with the queen and reproducing. This behavior also indicates that if the drone blocks other drones from mating with the queen, it will allow the mating drone to fertilize a greater number of the queen's eggs. If the drone does not remain within the queen and removes itself from her, the drone can reproduce again with slim chances. Finally, the drone will die after mating with the queen within minutes or hours after reproduction is complete.

== Defense ==
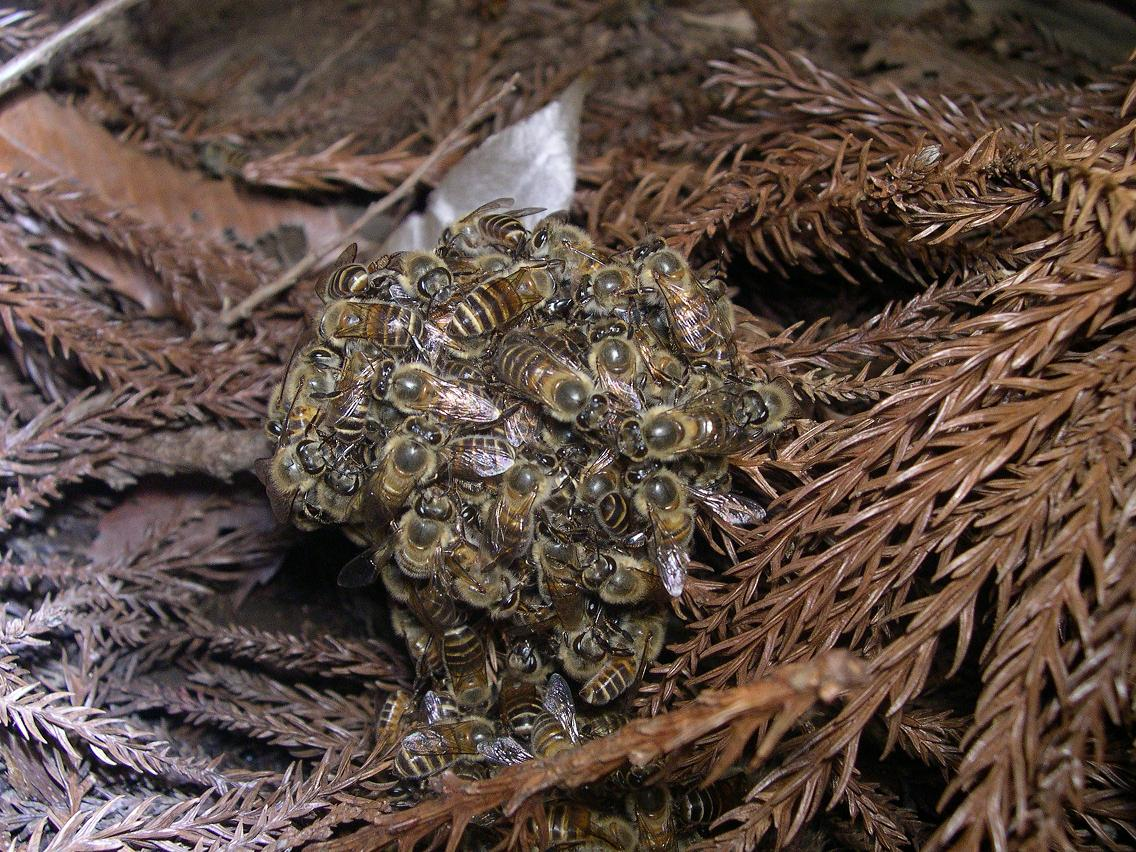
Apis cerana japonica forming a ball around two hornets: The body heat trapped by the ball will overheat and kill the hornets.

All honey bees live in colonies where the workers sting intruders as a form of defense, and alarmed bees release a pheromone that stimulates the attack response in other bees. The different species of honey bees are distinguished from all other bee species by the possession of small barbs on the sting, but these barbs are found only in the worker bees.

The sting apparatus, including the barbs, may have evolved specifically in response to predation by vertebrates, as the barbs do not usually function (and the sting apparatus does not detach) unless the sting is embedded in fleshy tissue. While the sting can also penetrate the membranes between joints in the exoskeleton of other insects (and is used in fights between queens), in the case of Apis cerana japonica, defense against larger insects such as predatory wasps (e.g. Asian giant hornet) is usually performed by surrounding the intruder with a mass of defending worker bees, which vibrate their muscles vigorously to raise the temperature of the intruder to a lethal level ("balling"). Previously, heat alone was thought to be responsible for killing intruding wasps, but recent experiments have demonstrated the increased temperature in combination with increased carbon dioxide levels within the ball produces the lethal effect. This phenomenon is also used to kill a queen perceived as intruding or defective, an action known to beekeepers as 'balling the queen', named for the ball of bees formed.

Defense can vary based on the habitat of the bee. In the case of those honey bee species with open combs (e.g., A. dorsata), would-be predators are given a warning signal that takes the form of a "wave" that spreads as a ripple across a layer of bees densely packed on the surface of the comb when a threat is perceived and consists of bees momentarily arching their bodies and flicking their wings. In cavity dwelling species such as Apis cerana, Apis mellifera, and Apis nigrocincta, entrances to these cavities are guarded and checked for intruders in incoming traffic. Another act of defense against nest invaders, particularly wasps, is "body shaking", a violent and pendulum-like swaying of the abdomen, performed by worker bees.

A 2020 study of Apis cerana in Vietnam found that they use feces and even human urine to defend their hives against raids by hornets (Vespa soror), a strategy not replicated by their European and North American counterparts, though collection and use of feces in nest construction is well-known in stingless bees.

=== Venom ===
The stings of honey bees are barbed and therefore embed themselves into the sting site, and the sting apparatus has its own musculature and ganglion which keep delivering venom even after detachment. The gland which produces the alarm pheromone is also associated with the sting apparatus. The embedded stinger continues to emit additional alarm pheromones after it has torn loose; other defensive workers are thereby attracted to the sting site. The worker dies after the sting becomes lodged and is subsequently torn loose from the bee's abdomen. The honey bee's venom, known as apitoxin, carries several active components, the most abundant of which is melittin, and the most biologically active are enzymes, particularly phospholipase A2.

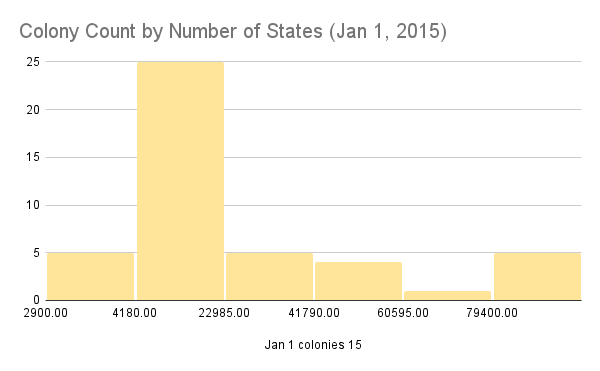
Shows active colonies on January 1, 2015 with U.S. state count. The highest states being those like California and Florida with the most colonies.

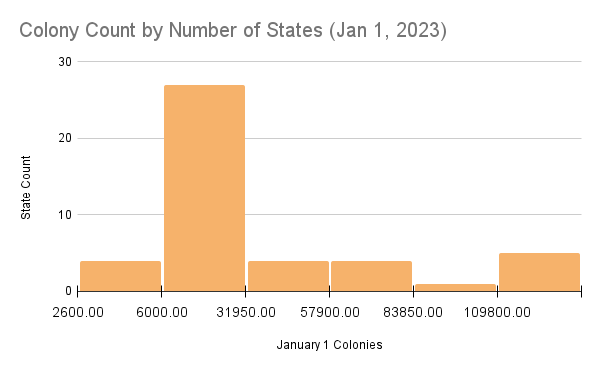
Shows active colonies on January 1, 2023 with state count. The highest states being those like California and Texas with the most production.

Honey bee venom is under laboratory and clinical research for its potential properties and uses in reducing risks for adverse events from bee venom therapy, rheumatoid arthritis, and use as an immunotherapy for protection against allergies from insect stings. Bee venom products are marketed in many countries, but, as of 2018, there are no approved clinical uses for these products which carry various warnings for potential allergic reactions.

== Competition ==
With an increasing population of honey bees in specific areas due to beekeeping, Western honey bees (as an invasive species) and native wild bees often have to compete for the limited habitat and food sources available, and Western honey bees may become defensive in response to the seasonal arrival of competition from other colonies, particularly Africanized bees which may be on the offence and defence year round due to their tropical origin.

== Communication ==
Honey bees are known to communicate through many different chemicals and odors, as is common in insects. They also rely on a sophisticated dance language that conveys information about the distance and direction to a specific location (typically a nutritional source, e.g., flowers or water). The dance language is also used during the process of colony fission, or swarming, when scouts communicate the location and quality of nesting sites.

The details of the signalling being used vary from species to species; for example, the two smallest species, Apis andreniformis and A. florea, dance on the upper surface of the comb, which is horizontal (not vertical, as in other species), and worker bees orient the dance in the actual compass direction of the resource to which they are recruiting.

Carniolan honey bees (Apis mellifera carnica) use their antennae asymmetrically for social interactions, with a strong lateral preference to use their right antennae.

There has been speculation as to honey bee consciousness. While honey bees lack the parts of the brain that a human being uses for consciousness like the cerebral cortex or even the cerebrum itself, when those parts of a human brain are damaged, the midbrain seems able to provide a small amount of consciousness. Honey bees have a tiny structure that appears similar to a human midbrain, so if it functions the same way they may be able to achieve a small amount of simple awareness of their bodies.

== Symbolism ==
The bee was used as a symbol of government by Emperor Napoleon I of France. Both the Hindu Atharva Veda and the ancient Greeks associated lips anointed with honey with the gift of eloquence and even of prescience. The priestess at Delphi was the "Delphic Bee".

In Christian art and heraldry, the bee has been used as a papal emblem. The Barberini family, from which Pope Urban VIII came, bore three bees in their coat of arms, and these bees appear throughout St. Peter's Basilica and other Rome monuments as symbols of the pope’s authority and industry.

The Quran has a Sura (chapter) titled "The Bee". It is named after honey bees and contains a comparison of the industry and adaptability of honey bees to the industry of man.

And your Lord inspired the bees: "Make [your] homes in the mountains, the trees, and in what people construct, and feed from [the flower of] any fruit [you please] and follow the ways your Lord has made easy for you." From their bellies comes forth liquid of varying colours, in which there is healing for people. Surely in this is a sign for those who reflect.

— Surah An-Nahl 16:68–69

In ancient Egyptian mythology, honey bees were believed to be born from the tears of the Sun god, Ra. Because of their divine origin, they were used to represent the Pharaoh. They were also used as a symbol of Lower Egypt in conjunction with the sedge, which represented Upper Egypt.

In Joseph and Asenath, a work composed by ancient Egyptian Jews who may have been affiliated with the Leontopolis temple, bee and honey imagery appears when Asenath converts and is visited by an angel. If the work was indeed connected to the Leontopolis temple, the bees likely represent Levite priests, and the imagery intends to signify the legitimacy of a Jewish temple in Egypt.

A community of honey bees has often been employed by political theorists as a model of human society, from Aristotle and Plato to Virgil. Honey bees, signifying immortality and resurrection, were royal emblems of the Merovingians. The U.S. state of Utah is called the "Beehive State"; the state emblem is the beehive, the state insect is the honey bee, and a beehive appears on both the state flag and seal.

== Gallery ==
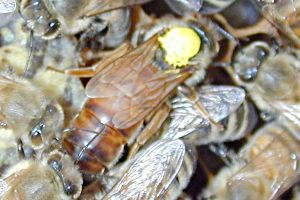
A coloured dot applied by a beekeeper identifies a queen Western honey bee.

Western honey bee foragers loaded with pollen on the hive landing board

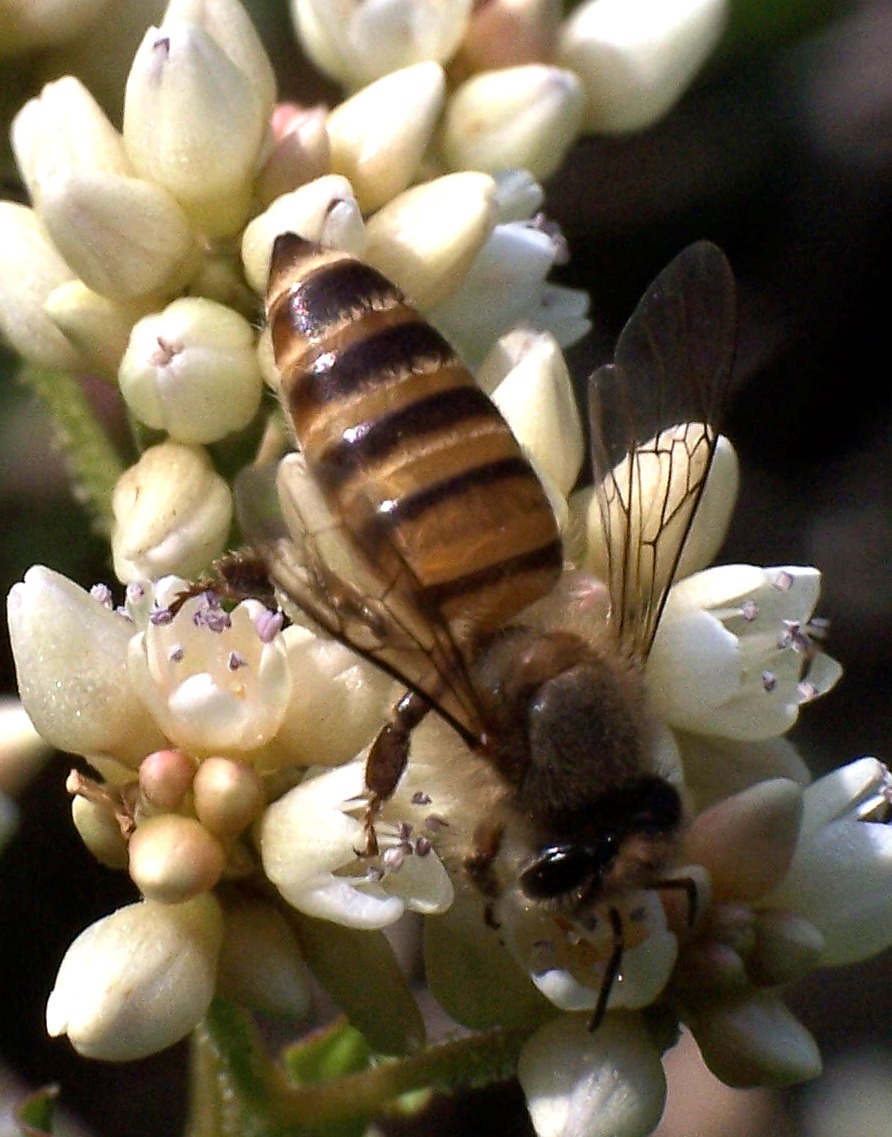
Eastern honey bee (A. cerana) in Hong Kong

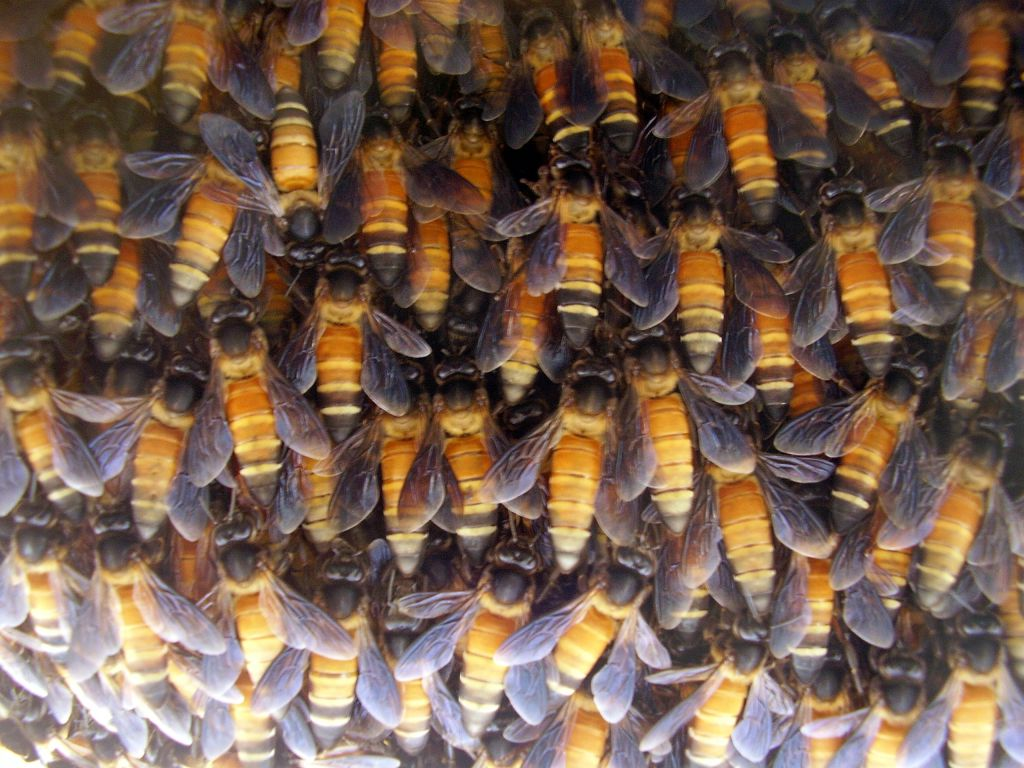
Giant honey bee (A. dorsata)

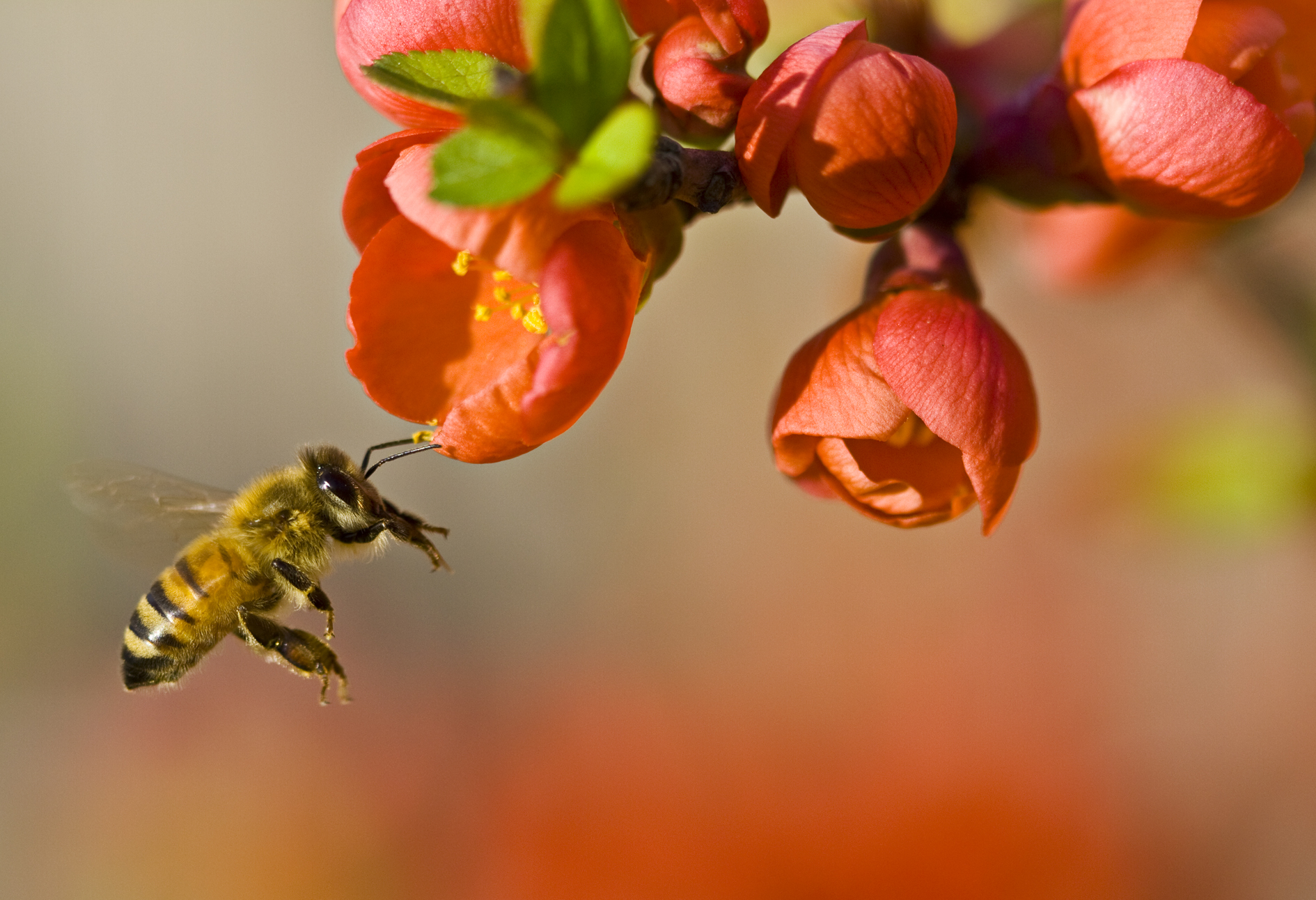
Western honey bee visiting flowers

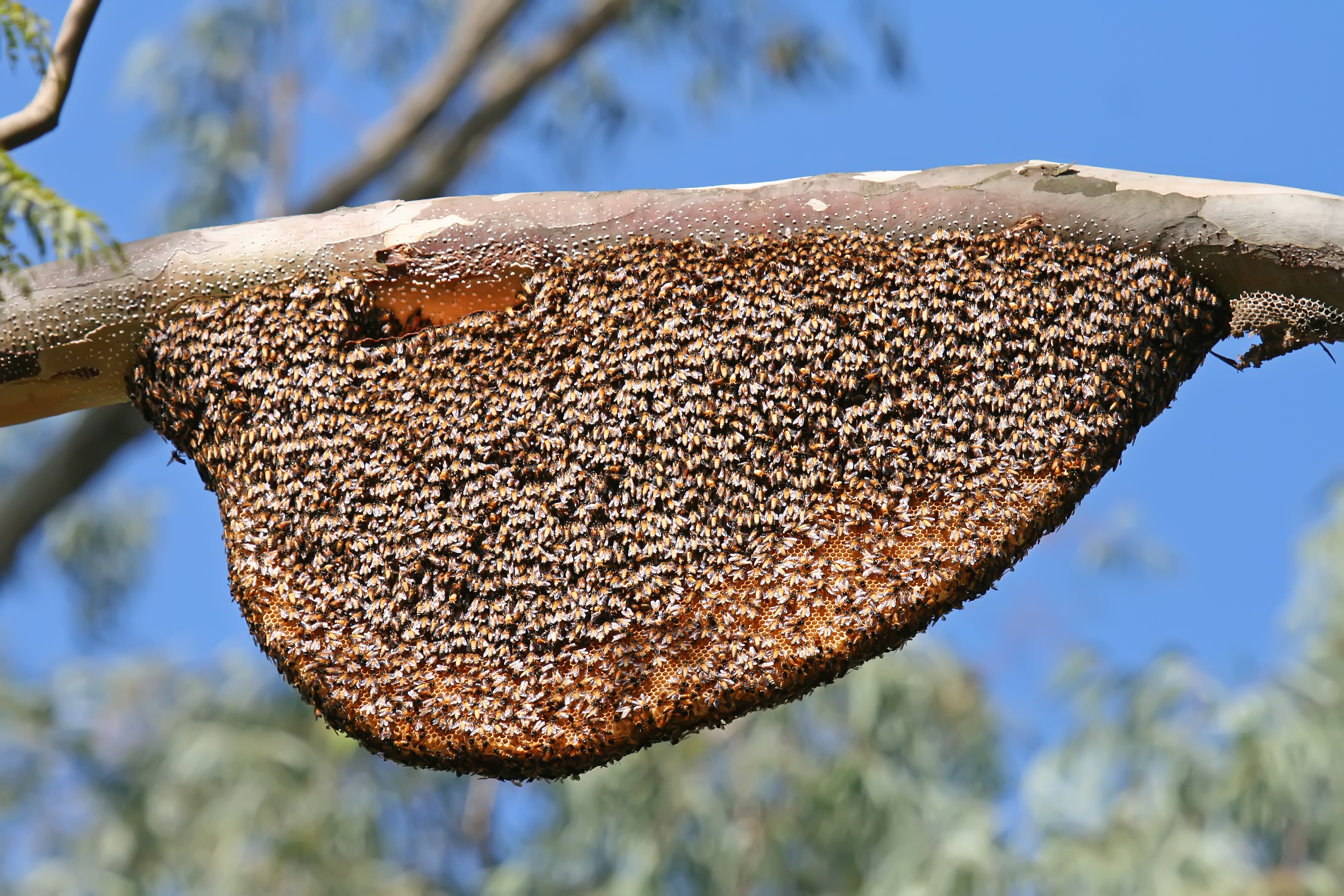
A colony of giant honey bees (A. dorsata) on their comb

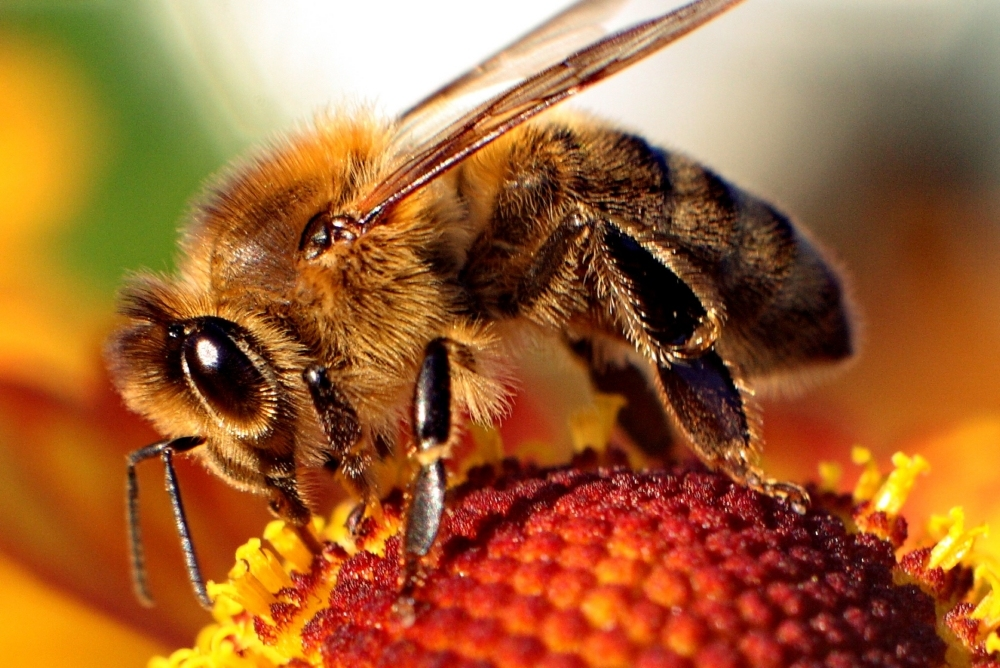
Western honey bee

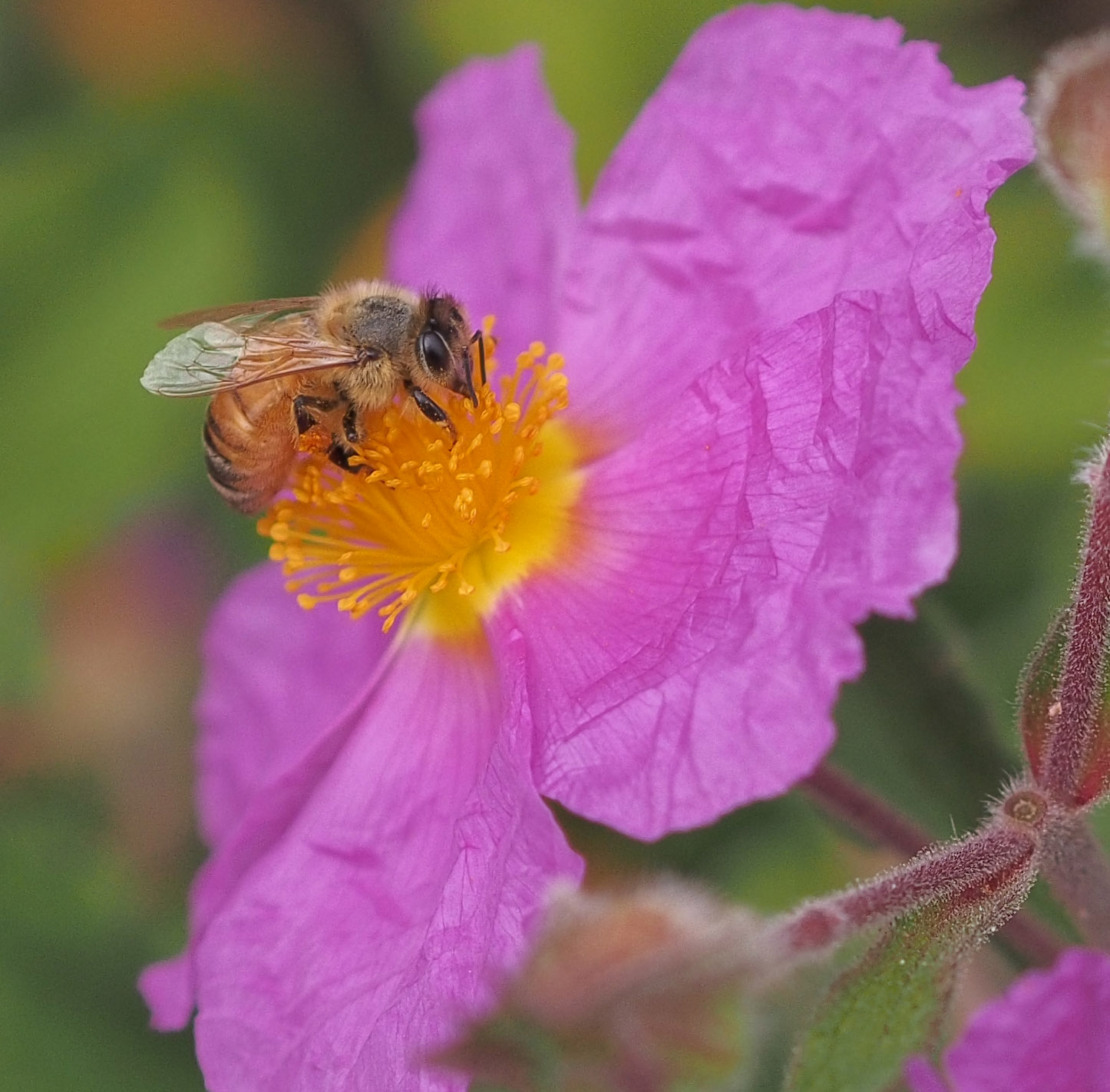
Western honey bee on rock rose (Cistus) in Oakland, California

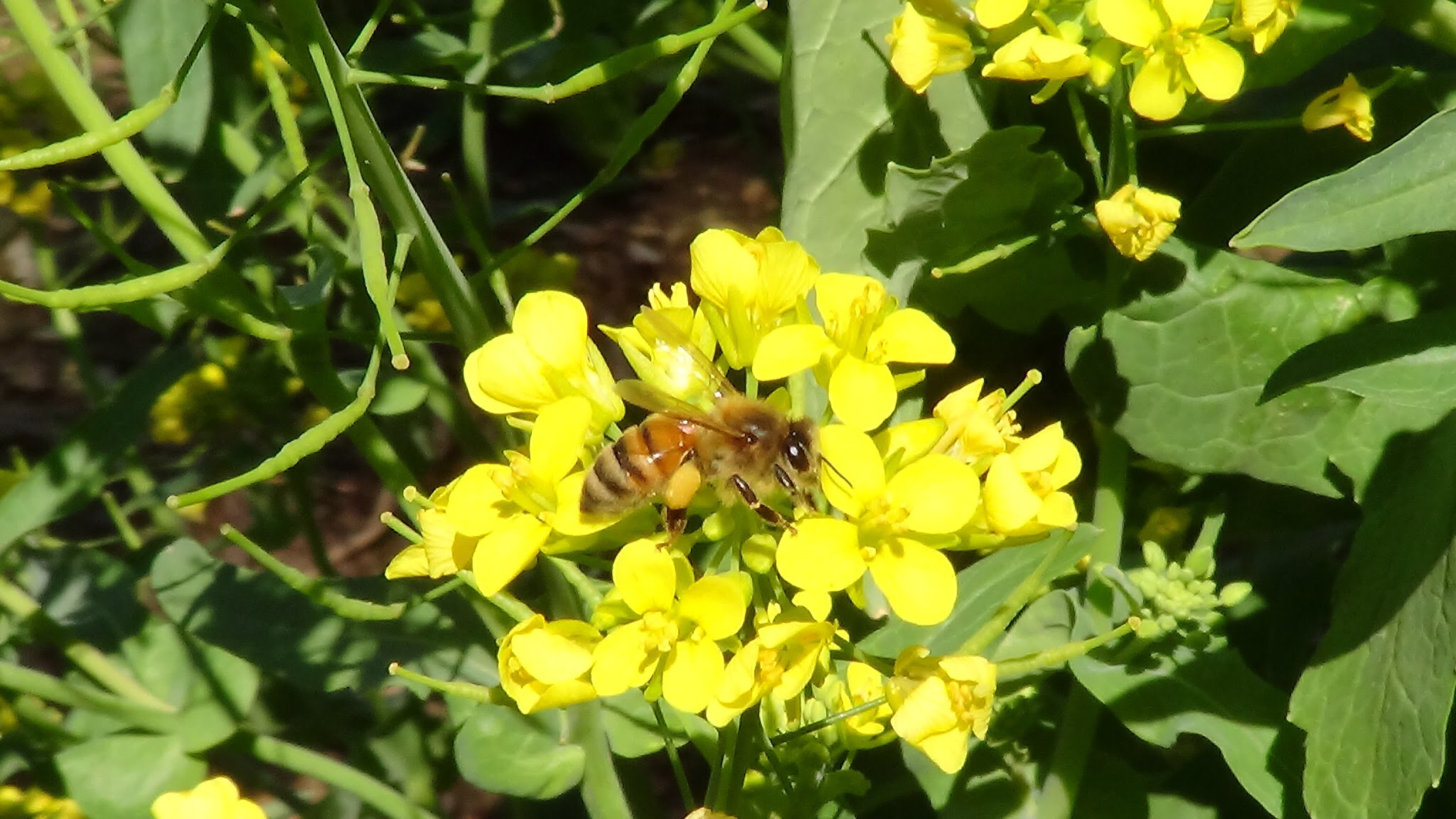
Western honey bee collecting pollen from turnip blossoms in Eastern Oklahoma

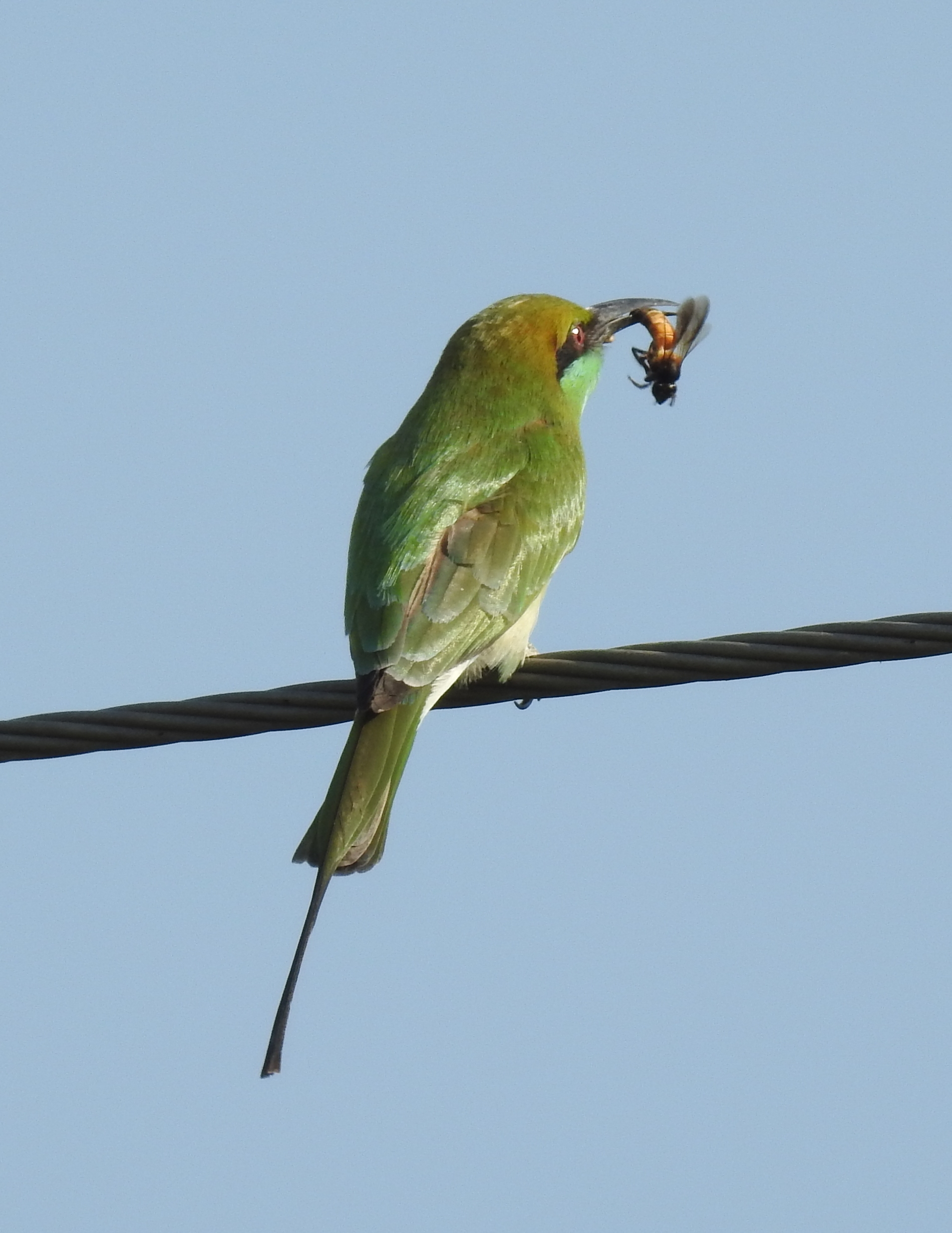
A predator, the Asian green bee-eater

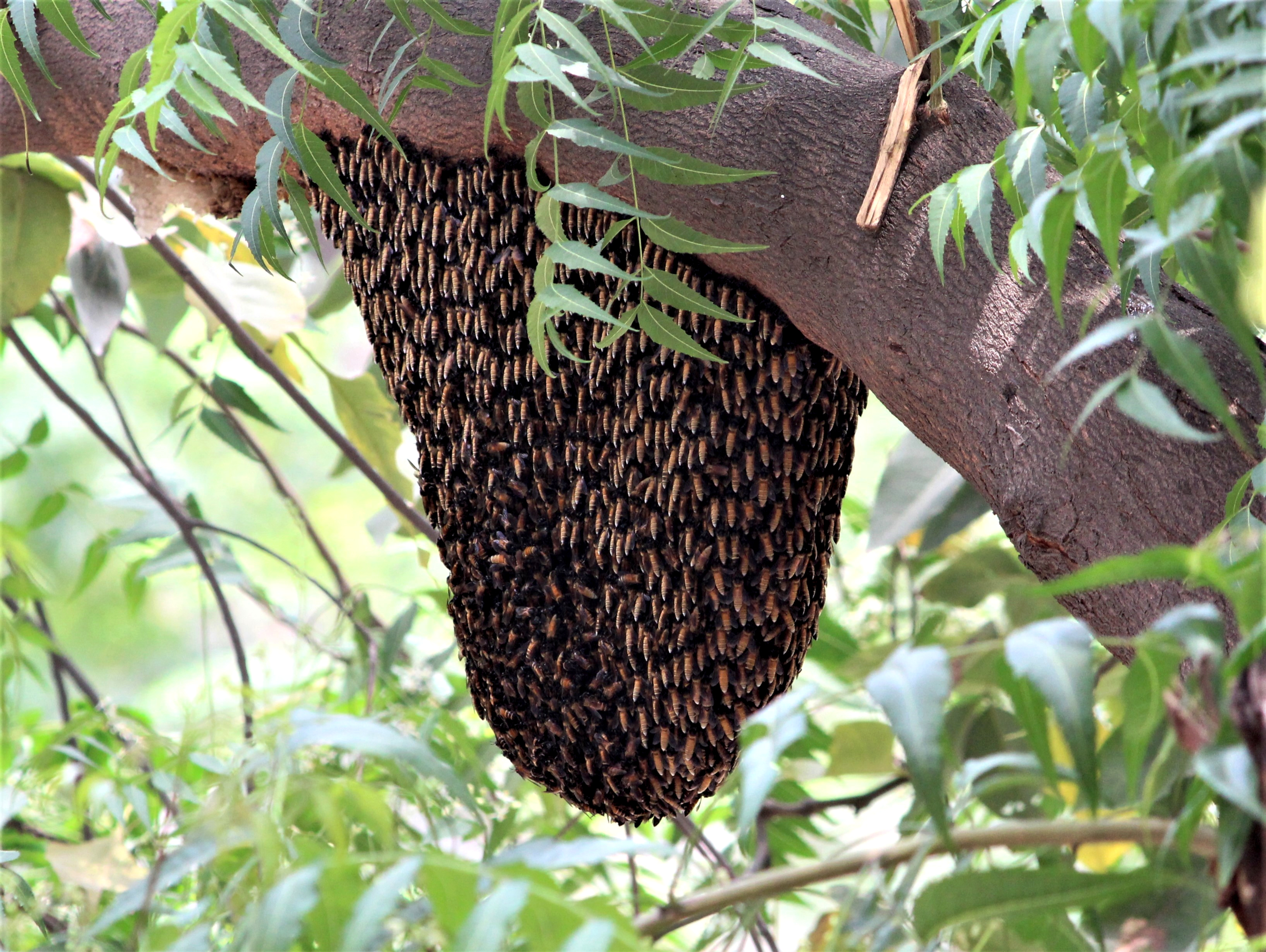
A wild colony in Chandigarh

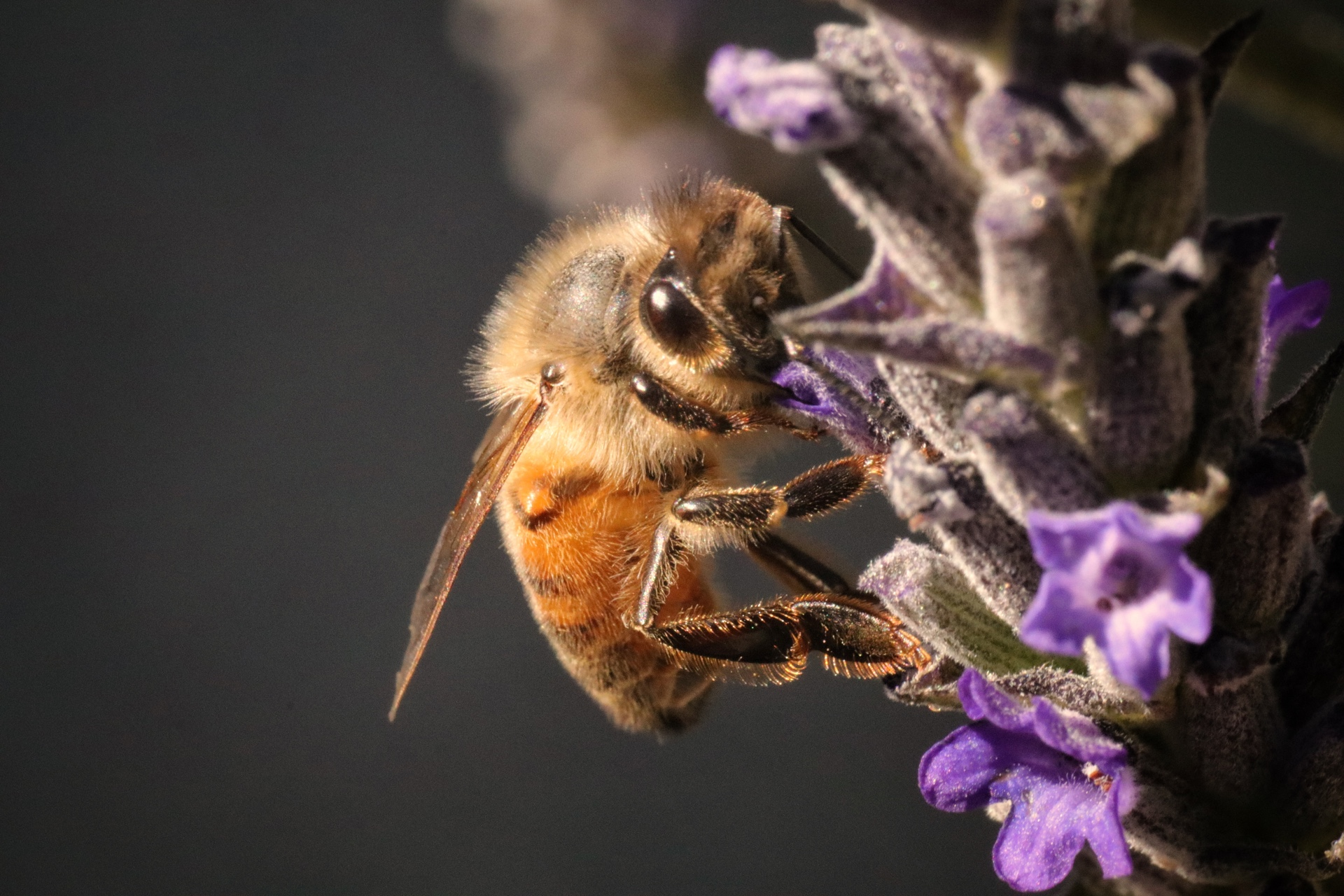
Western honey bee on lavender (Lavandula) in Lompoc, California

== See also ==
- Honey bee life cycle
- Honey bee starvation
- More than Honey – a 2012 Swiss documentary film about honey bees
- Melittology (also known as apiology) – the study of bees
- Honey wasp – Genus of wasps known to collect and store nectar as honey
- Pollen wasp – Subfamily of wasps unique among wasps in feeding their larvae exclusively with pollen and nectar, in a fashion quite similar to many solitary bees
- Honeypot ant
