= Apis lithohermaea =

Apis lithohermaea Temporal range: Miocene

Scientific classification
- Kingdom: Animalia
- Phylum: Arthropoda
- Clade: Pancrustacea
- Class: Insecta
- Order: Hymenoptera
- Family: Apidae
- Genus: Apis
- Species: †A. lithohermaea

Binomial name
- †Apis lithohermaea Engel, 2006

Extinct species of honey bee

Apis lithohermaea, also known as the giant honey bee (not to be confused with the extant Apis dorsata, also known as the giant honey bee) is an extinct species of honey bee in the dorsata species group. It is the largest fossil honey bee and one of the biggest honey bees ever discovered, rivaling in size the modern Apis dorsata and could matching as well, and is the first recorded fossil of the dorsata species group. Although the dorsata group does not occur further north than Tibet, south than southern China and Philippines.

The type fossil specimen of A. lithohermaea was collected from Iki Island, Japan.
