= Hamaxia incongrua =

Scientific classification
- Kingdom: Animalia
- Phylum: Arthropoda
- Class: Insecta
- Order: Diptera
- Family: Tachinidae
- Subfamily: Tachininae
- Tribe: Palpostomatini
- Genus: Hamaxia
- Species: H. incongrua

Binomial name
- Hamaxia incongrua Walker, 1860

Species of fly

Hamaxia incongrua is a species of tachinid flies in the genus Hamaxia of the family Tachinidae. It is normally found in the Australasian biorealm, but may also be found in the Oriental and Palearctic realms. It is a parasite of numerous Scarabaeidae species, such as Popillia japonica.

== Distribution ==
It can be found in China, Japan, Korean Peninsula, Russia, Indonesia, Sumatra, Malaysia, and Indonesia.
