= Zenillia libatrix =

Scientific classification
- Kingdom: Animalia
- Phylum: Arthropoda
- Class: Insecta
- Order: Diptera
- Family: Tachinidae
- Subfamily: Exoristinae
- Tribe: Goniini
- Genus: Zenillia
- Species: Z. libatrix

Binomial name
- Zenillia libatrix (Geoffroy, 1785)

Synonyms
- Exorista ancilla Meigen, 1838; Musca libatrix Geoffroy, 1785; Musca libatrix Panzer, 1797; Musca ochracea Ratzeburg, 1840; Myxexorista macrops Brauer & von Berganstamm, 1891; Tachina fulva Fallén, 1820; Zenillia aurea Robineau-Desvoidy, 1863; Zenillia discrepta Pandellé, 1895; Zenillia orgyae Robineau-Desvoidy, 1850; Zenillia perplexa Pandellé, 1895

Species of fly

Zenillia libatrix is a species of flies in the family Tachinidae.

== Distribution ==
It can be found in the British Isles, Czech Republic, Hungary, Moldova, Poland, Romania, Slovakia, Ukraine, Denmark, Finland, Norway, Sweden, Bulgaria, Croatia, Italy, Macedonia, Serbia, Spain, Turkey, Austria, Belgium, France, Germany, Netherlands, Switzerland, Japan, Iran, Russia, Armenia, and China.
