= Hamaxia cumatilis =

Scientific classification
- Kingdom: Animalia
- Phylum: Arthropoda
- Class: Insecta
- Order: Diptera
- Family: Tachinidae
- Subfamily: Tachininae
- Tribe: Palpostomatini
- Genus: Hamaxia
- Species: H. cumatilis

Binomial name
- Hamaxia cumatilis Mesnil, 1978

Species of fly

Hamaxia cumatilis is a species of tachinid flies in the genus Hamaxia of the family Tachinidae.

== Distribution ==
Madagascar
