= Thrixion aberrans =

Scientific classification
- Kingdom: Animalia
- Phylum: Arthropoda
- Class: Insecta
- Order: Diptera
- Family: Tachinidae
- Subfamily: Exoristinae
- Tribe: Thrixionini
- Genus: Thrixion
- Species: T. aberrans

Binomial name
- Thrixion aberrans (Schiner, 1861)

Synonyms
- Phytomyptera aberrans Schiner, 1861; Phytomyptera halidayana Rondani, 1872

Species of fly

Thrixion aberrans is a species of fly in the family Tachinidae.

== Distribution ==
Poland, Albania, Croatia, Greece, Italy, Portugal, Spain, France, Israel.
