= Eutrixa exilis =

Scientific classification
- Kingdom: Animalia
- Phylum: Arthropoda
- Class: Insecta
- Order: Diptera
- Family: Tachinidae
- Subfamily: Tachininae
- Tribe: Palpostomatini
- Genus: Eutrixa
- Species: E. exilis

Binomial name
- Eutrixa exilis (Coquillett, 1895)

Synonyms
- Clytiomyia exile Coquillett, 1895

Species of fly

Eutrixa exilis is a species of fly in the family Tachinidae.

== Distribution ==
Canada, United States.
