= Zamimus =

Scientific classification
- Kingdom: Animalia
- Phylum: Arthropoda
- Class: Insecta
- Order: Diptera
- Family: Tachinidae
- Subfamily: Tachininae
- Tribe: Palpostomatini
- Genus: Zamimus; Malloch, 1932

Type species
- Zamimus pendleburyi Malloch, 1932

Genus of flies

Zamimus is a genus of flies in the family Tachinidae.

== Species ==
- Zamimus pendleburyi Malloch, 1932

== Distribution ==
Malaysia
