= Istocheta longicornis =

Scientific classification
- Kingdom: Animalia
- Phylum: Arthropoda
- Class: Insecta
- Order: Diptera
- Family: Tachinidae
- Subfamily: Exoristinae
- Tribe: Blondeliini
- Genus: Istocheta
- Species: I. longicornis

Binomial name
- Istocheta longicornis (Fallén, 1810)

Synonyms
- Tachina longicornis Fallén, 1810

Species of fly

Istocheta longicornis is a species of fly in the family Tachinidae.

== Distribution ==
Czech Republic, Hungary, Poland, Ukraine, Scandinavia, Finland, Norway, Sweden, Italy, Serbia, Turkey, Belgium, France, Germany, Netherlands, Switzerland, Russia.
