= Isidotus =

Scientific classification
- Kingdom: Animalia
- Phylum: Arthropoda
- Class: Insecta
- Order: Diptera
- Family: Tachinidae
- Subfamily: Tachininae
- Tribe: Palpostomatini
- Genus: Isidotus; Reinhard, 1962

Type species
- Isidotus incanus Reinhard, 1962

Genus of flies

Isidotus is a genus of flies in the family Tachinidae.

== Species ==
- Isidotus incanus Reinhard, 1962

== Distribution ==
United States, Mexico.
