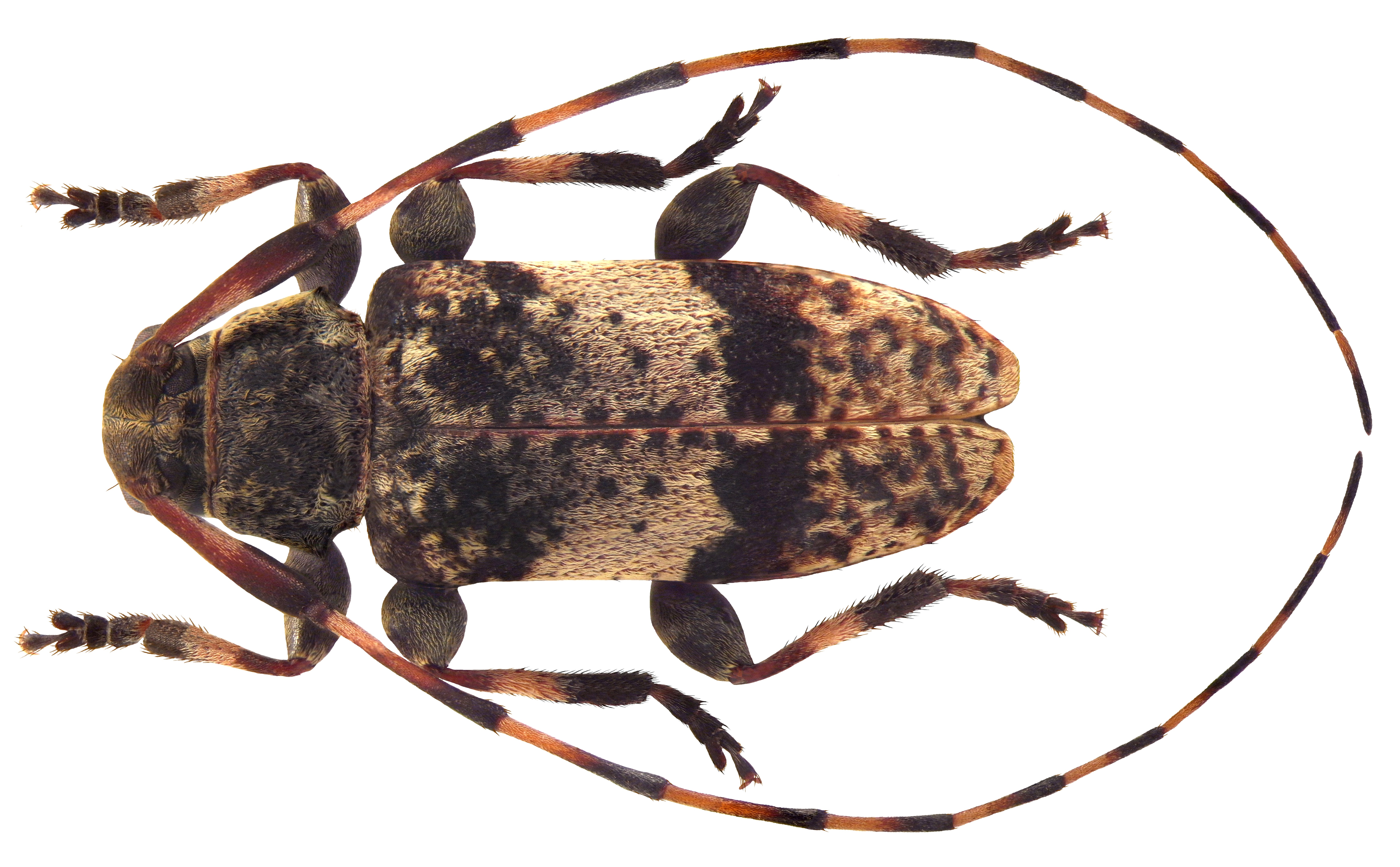

Scientific classification
- Kingdom: Animalia
- Phylum: Arthropoda
- Class: Insecta
- Order: Coleoptera
- Suborder: Polyphaga
- Infraorder: Cucujiformia
- Family: Cerambycidae
- Genus: Leiopus
- Species: L. nebulosus

Binomial name
- Leiopus nebulosus (Linnaeus, 1758)

Synonyms
- List: Cerambyx bifasciatus Goeze, 1777; Cerambyx fasciatus Villers, 1789; Cerambyx monilis Geoffroy, 1785; Cerambyx nebulosus Linnaeus, 1758; Cerambyx niger Geoffroy, 1762; Cerambyx taeniatus Gmelin, 1790

= Leiopus nebulosus =

Species of beetle

Leiopus nebulosus is a species of longhorn beetle of the subfamily Lamiinae. It was described by Carl Linnaeus in his landmark 1758 10th edition of Systema Naturae. It contains two subspecies; the first, L. nebulosus nebulosus, is known from Europe and Russia, and the second, L. nebulosus caucasicus, is endemic to the mountains of the Caucasus (from which its species epithet is derived). The beetles inhabit deciduous trees, including those in the genera Fagus, Quercus, Carpinus, Juglans, Acer, Ulmus, Betula, Salix, and Prunus. They measure 5–10 millimetres in length, and can live for approximately 1–2 years.

== Subspecies ==
- Leiopus nebulosus nebulosus (Linnaeus, 1758)
- Leiopus nebulosus caucasicus Ganglbauer, 1887
