= Eustacomyia =

Scientific classification
- Kingdom: Animalia
- Phylum: Arthropoda
- Clade: Pancrustacea
- Class: Insecta
- Order: Diptera
- Family: Tachinidae
- Subfamily: Tachininae
- Tribe: Palpostomatini
- Genus: Eustacomyia; Malloch, 1927

Type species
- Eustacomyia breviseta Malloch, 1927

Genus of flies

Eustacomyia is a genus of flies in the family Tachinidae.

== Species ==
- Eustacomyia breviseta Malloch, 1927
- Eustacomyia hirta Malloch, 1930

== Distribution ==
New South Wales
