= Hamaxiella =

Scientific classification
- Kingdom: Animalia
- Phylum: Arthropoda
- Class: Insecta
- Order: Diptera
- Family: Tachinidae
- Subfamily: Tachininae
- Tribe: Palpostomatini
- Genus: Hamaxiella; Mesnil, 1967

Type species
- Hamaxiella brunnescens Mesnil, 1967

Genus of flies

Hamaxiella is a genus of flies in the family Tachinidae.

== Species ==
- Hamaxiella brunnescens Mesnil, 1967

== Distribution ==
China.
