= Palpostoma =

Scientific classification
- Kingdom: Animalia
- Phylum: Arthropoda
- Class: Insecta
- Order: Diptera
- Family: Tachinidae
- Subfamily: Tachininae
- Tribe: Palpostomatini
- Genus: Palpostoma; Robineau-Desvoidy, 1830

Type species
- Palpostoma testacea Robineau-Desvoidy, 1830

Synonyms
- Afromeigenia Curran, 1927; Hamaxiomima Verbeke, 1962; Ochromeigenia Townsend, 1919; Opsophasiops Townsend, 1915; Pseudopalpostoma Townsend, 1926

Genus of flies

Palpostoma is a genus of flies in the family Tachinidae.

== Species ==
- Palpostoma africanum (Verbeke, 1962)
- Palpostoma aldrichi Hardy, 1938
- Palpostoma apicale Malloch, 1927
- Palpostoma armiceps Malloch, 1931
- Palpostoma desvoidyi Aldrich, 1922
- Palpostoma flavum (Coquillett, 1900)
- Palpostoma incongruum (Walker, 1860)
- Palpostoma laticorne (Verbeke, 1962)
- Palpostoma mutatum (Villeneuve, 1936)
- Palpostoma pallens (Curran, 1927)
- Palpostoma pilosum (Verbeke, 1962)
- Palpostoma subsessile Malloch, 1931
- Palpostoma testacea Robineau-Desvoidy, 1830
