= Eutrixa =

Scientific classification
- Kingdom: Animalia
- Phylum: Arthropoda
- Class: Insecta
- Order: Diptera
- Family: Tachinidae
- Subfamily: Tachininae
- Tribe: Palpostomatini
- Genus: Eutrixa; Coquillett, 1897

Type species
- Tachina masuria Walker, 1849

Genus of flies

Eutrixa is a genus of flies in the family Tachinidae.

== Species ==
- Eutrixa exilis (Coquillett, 1895)
- Eutrixa laxifrons Reinhard, 1962
