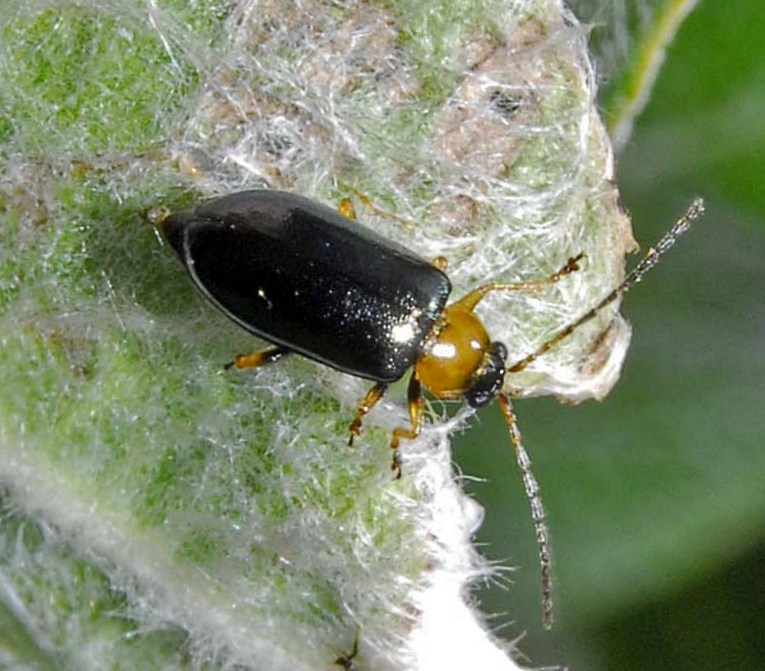
- Luperus flavipes

Scientific classification
- Kingdom: Animalia
- Phylum: Arthropoda
- Clade: Pancrustacea
- Class: Insecta
- Order: Coleoptera
- Suborder: Polyphaga
- Infraorder: Cucujiformia
- Family: Chrysomelidae
- Tribe: Luperini
- Subtribe: Luperina
- Genus: Luperus; Geoffroy, 1762

Synonyms
- Lyperus Agassiz, 1846; Lyperus Bedel, 1892; Lyperus Billberg, 1820

= Luperus =

Genus of beetles

Luperus is a genus of mostly Palaearctic, skeletonizing leaf beetles, belonging to the family Chrysomelidae, subfamily Galerucinae and typical of the tribe Luperini.

== Genera ==
European species within this genus include:

- Luperus abdominalis Rosenhauer, 1856
- Luperus aetolicus Kiesenwetter, 1861
- Luperus alpicus Desbrochers, 1898
- Luperus armeniacus Kiesenwetter, 1878
- Luperus biraghii Ragusa, 1871
- Luperus calabricus Laboissière, 1911
- Luperus circassicus Medvedev, 1962
- Luperus cyanipennis Küster, 1848
- Luperus fiorii Weise, 1895
- Luperus flaviceps Apfelbeck, 1912
- Luperus flavipennis Lucas, 1849
  - Luperus flavipennis flavus Rosenhauer, 1856
- Luperus flavipes (Linnaeus, 1767) - type species (as Chrysomela flavipes L.)
- Luperus floralis Faldermann, 1837
- Luperus graecus Weise, 1886
- Luperus kiesenwetteri Joannis, 1865
- Luperus kiritshenkoi Ogloblin, 1936
- Luperus leonardii Fogato, 1979
- Luperus longicornis (Fabricius, 1781)
- Luperus luperus (Sulzer, 1776)
- Luperus maculicornis Desbrochers, 1872
- Luperus nigripes Kiessenwetter, 1861
- Luperus pygmaeus Joannis, 1865
- Luperus pyrenaeus Germar, 1824
- Luperus ragusai Laboissière, 1919
- Luperus revelierei Perris, 1864
- Luperus rhilensis Weise, 1900
- Luperus rugifrons Weise, 1886
- Luperus saxonicus (Gmellin, 1790)
- Luperus sulphuripes Graells, 1858
- Luperus viridipennis Germar, 1824
- Luperus vitalei Ragusa, 1923
- Luperus xanthopoda (Schrank, 1781)
