= Palpostoma mutatum =

Scientific classification
- Domain: Eukaryota
- Kingdom: Animalia
- Phylum: Arthropoda
- Class: Insecta
- Order: Diptera
- Family: Tachinidae
- Genus: Palpostoma
- Species: P. mutatum

Binomial name
- Palpostoma mutatum (Villeneuve, 1936)

Synonyms
- Hamaxia mutatum Villeneuve, 1936; Hamaxiomima picta Verbeke, 1962

Species of fly

Palpostoma mutatum is a species of tachinid flies in the genus Palpostoma of the family Tachinidae.
