= Paraxanthobasis =

Scientific classification
- Kingdom: Animalia
- Phylum: Arthropoda
- Class: Insecta
- Order: Diptera
- Family: Tachinidae
- Subfamily: Tachininae
- Tribe: Palpostomatini
- Genus: Paraxanthobasis; Blanchard, 1966

Type species
- Paraxanthobasis tibialis Blanchard, 1966

Genus of flies

Paraxanthobasis is a genus of flies in the family Tachinidae.

== Species ==
- Paraxanthobasis tibialis Blanchard, 1966

== Distribution ==
Argentina
