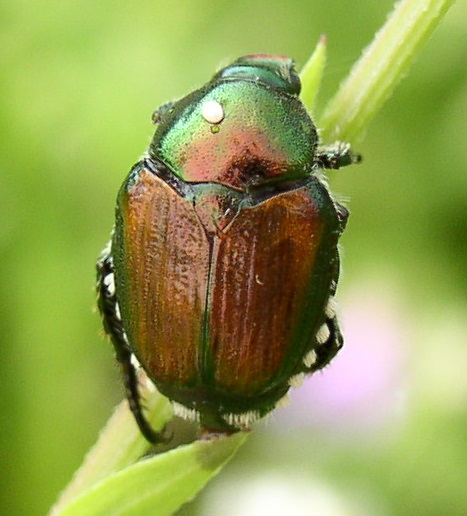
- Istocheta aldrichi egg on Japanese beetle

Scientific classification
- Kingdom: Animalia
- Phylum: Arthropoda
- Clade: Pancrustacea
- Class: Insecta
- Order: Diptera
- Family: Tachinidae
- Subfamily: Exoristinae
- Tribe: Blondeliini
- Genus: Istocheta; Rondani, 1859

Type species
- Istocheta frontosa (= Phorocera cinerea Macquart, 1850 Rondani, 1859

Synonyms
- Centeter Aldrich, 1923; Fallenia Meigen, 1838; Frivaldskyia Schiner, 1861; Haydaea Robineau-Desvoidy, 1863; Histochaeta Brauer & von Berganstamm, 1891; Histochaeta Reinhard, 1943; Histochaeta Verrall, 1882; Hyperecteina Schiner, 1861; Istochaeta Marschall, 1873; Latigena Stein, 1924; Orienticola Borisova, 1963; Urophylla Brauer & von Berganstamm, 1889; Urophylloides Brauer, 1893

= Istocheta =

Genus of flies

Istocheta is a genus of flies in the family Tachinidae.

== Species ==
- Istocheta adrufipes (Borisova, 1964)
- Istocheta aldrichi (Mesnil, 1953)
- Istocheta altaica (Borisova, 1963)
- Istocheta amita (Borisova, 1965)
- Istocheta barbata (Mesnil, 1961)
- Istocheta cinerea (Macquart, 1851)
- Istocheta ectinohopliae (Borisova, 1963)
- Istocheta hemichaeta (Brauer & von Berganstamm, 1889)
- Istocheta incisor Tschorsnig, 2011
- Istocheta longicornis (Fallén, 1810)
- Istocheta luteiceps (Mesnil, 1963)
- Istocheta maladerivora (Borisova, 1963)
- Istocheta melliculus Richter, 1995
- Istocheta mesnil (Borisova, 1964)
- Istocheta nyctia (Borisova, 1966)
- Istocheta polyphyllae (Villeneuve, 1917)
- Istocheta rhombonicis (Borisova, 1963)
- Istocheta rohdendorfi (Borisova, 1966)
- Istocheta splendens (Borisova, 1963)
- Istocheta steinbergi (Borisova, 1964)
- Istocheta subcinerea (Borisova, 1966)
- Istocheta subrufipes (Borisova, 1964)
- Istocheta torrida (Richter, 1976)
- Istocheta transcaspica (Villeneuve, 1920)
- Istocheta unicolor (Aldrich, 1928)
- Istocheta ussuriensis (Rohdendorf, 1949)
- Istocheta zimini (Borisova, 1964)
