= Eutrixopsis =

Scientific classification
- Kingdom: Animalia
- Phylum: Arthropoda
- Clade: Pancrustacea
- Class: Insecta
- Order: Diptera
- Family: Tachinidae
- Subfamily: Tachininae
- Tribe: Palpostomatini
- Genus: Eutrixopsis; Townsend, 1919

Type species
- Eutrixopsis javana Townsend, 1919

Synonyms
- Eutrixina Curran, 1938; Palpostomotrixa Townsend, 1927; Paratamiclea Villeneuve, 1936

Genus of flies

Eutrixopsis sp. in Nohara, Maizuru, Kyoto, Japan

Eutrixopsis is a genus of flies in the family Tachinidae.

== Species ==
- Eutrixopsis conica Zeegers, 2007
- Eutrixopsis hova (Villeneuve, 1938)
- Eutrixopsis javana Townsend, 1919
- Eutrixopsis kufferathi Verbeke, 1962
- Eutrixopsis pallida (Villeneuve, 1936)
- Eutrixopsis paradoxa (Townsend, 1927)
- Eutrixopsis petiolata Verbeke, 1962
- Eutrixopsis pinguis Mesnil, 1978
