= Neoxanthobasis =

Scientific classification
- Kingdom: Animalia
- Phylum: Arthropoda
- Class: Insecta
- Order: Diptera
- Family: Tachinidae
- Subfamily: Tachininae
- Tribe: Palpostomatini
- Genus: Neoxanthobasis; Blanchard, 1966
- Species: N. nigra

Binomial name
- Neoxanthobasis nigra Blanchard, 1966

Genus of flies

Neoxanthobasis is a genus of flies in the family Tachinidae.

== Species ==
- Neoxanthobasis nigra Blanchard, 1966

== Distribution ==
Neoxanthobasis is found in Argentina.
