= Hamaxia =

Scientific classification
- Kingdom: Animalia
- Phylum: Arthropoda
- Class: Insecta
- Order: Diptera
- Family: Tachinidae
- Subfamily: Tachininae
- Tribe: Palpostomatini
- Genus: Hamaxia; Walker, 1860

Type species
- Hamaxia incongrua Walker, 1860

Synonyms
- Hammaxia Brauer & von Berganstamm, 1893

Genus of flies

Hamaxia is a genus of flies in the family Tachinidae.

== Species ==
- Hamaxia cumatilis Mesnil, 1978
- Hamaxia incongrua Walker, 1860
- Hamaxia monochaeta Chao & Yang, 1998
