= Xanthooestrus =

Scientific classification
- Kingdom: Animalia
- Phylum: Arthropoda
- Class: Insecta
- Order: Diptera
- Family: Tachinidae
- Subfamily: Tachininae
- Tribe: Palpostomatini
- Genus: Xanthooestrus; Villeneuve, 1914

Type species
- Xanthooestrus fastousos Villeneuve, 1914

Genus of flies

Xanthooestrus is a genus of flies in the family Tachinidae.

== Species ==
- Xanthooestrus fastousos Villeneuve, 1914
- Xanthooestrus formosus Townsend, 1931

== Distribution ==
Taiwan.
