= Istocheta cinerea =

Scientific classification
- Kingdom: Animalia
- Phylum: Arthropoda
- Class: Insecta
- Order: Diptera
- Family: Tachinidae
- Subfamily: Exoristinae
- Tribe: Blondeliini
- Genus: Istocheta
- Species: I. cinerea

Binomial name
- Istocheta cinerea (Macquart, 1851)

Synonyms
- Haydaea frontalina Robineau-Desvoidy, 1863; Hyperecteina metopina Schiner, 1861; Hyperecteina villeneuvei Jacentkovský, 1937; Istocheta frontalis Rondani, 1859; Istocheta frontosa Rondani, 1859; Istocheta macrocheta Rondani, 1865; Phorocera cinerea Macquart, 1851; Urophylla leptotrichopa Brauer & von Berganstamm, 1889

Species of fly

Istocheta cinerea is a species of fly in the family Tachinidae.

== Distribution ==
Czech Republic, Hungary, Poland, Slovakia, Bulgaria, Italy, Serbia, Slovenia, Spain, Austria, France, Germany, Switzerland, Israel, Morocco.
