= Zenillia =

Scientific classification
- Kingdom: Animalia
- Phylum: Arthropoda
- Clade: Pancrustacea
- Class: Insecta
- Order: Diptera
- Family: Tachinidae
- Subfamily: Exoristinae
- Tribe: Goniini
- Genus: Zenillia; Robineau-Desvoidy, 1830

Type species
- Musca libatrix Geoffroy, 1785

Synonyms
- Myxexorista Brauer & von Bergenstamm, 1891

Genus of flies

Zenillia is a genus of flies in the family Tachinidae.

== Species ==
- Zenillia anomala (Villeneuve, 1929)
- Zenillia carceliaeformis (Villeneuve, 1937)
- Zenillia cuprescens (Walker, 1858)
- Zenillia dasychirae (Wulp, 1894)
- Zenillia dolosa (Meigen, 1824)
- Zenillia lasiocampae (Wulp, 1894)
- Zenillia libatrix (Geoffroy, 1785)
- Zenillia nigricornis (Fabricius, 1794)
- Zenillia nymphalidophaga (Baranov, 1936)
- Zenillia oculata (Baranov, 1932)
- Zenillia orientalis (Mesnil, 1953)
- Zenillia phrynoides (Baranov, 1939)
- Zenillia prognosticans (Walker, 1859)
- Zenillia rufofemorata (Baranov, 1936)
- Zenillia seniorwhitei (Baranov, 1938)
- Zenillia strigipennis (Wulp, 1894)
- Zenillia takanoi (Baranov, 1939)
