= Tachinoestrus =

Scientific classification
- Kingdom: Animalia
- Phylum: Arthropoda
- Class: Insecta
- Order: Diptera
- Family: Tachinidae
- Subfamily: Tachininae
- Tribe: Palpostomatini
- Genus: Tachinoestrus; Portschinsky, 1887

Type species
- Tachinoestrus semenovi Portschinsky, 1887

Synonyms
- Tachiroestrus Carus, 1888

Genus of flies

Tachinoestrus is a genus of flies in the family Tachinidae.

== Species ==
- Tachinoestrus semenovi Portschinsky, 1887

== Distribution ==
China
