= Peristasisea =

Scientific classification
- Kingdom: Animalia
- Phylum: Arthropoda
- Class: Insecta
- Order: Diptera
- Family: Tachinidae
- Subfamily: Tachininae
- Tribe: Palpostomatini
- Genus: Peristasisea; Villeneuve, 1934

Type species
- Peristasisea luteola Villeneuve, 1934

Synonyms
- Hamaxioides Mesnil, 1959

Genus of flies

Peristasisea is a genus of flies in the family Tachinidae.

== Species ==
- Peristasisea luteola Villeneuve, 1934

== Distribution ==
Congo, Malawi, Nigeria, Sudan, Tanzania, Uganda.
