= Gonzalezodoria =

Scientific classification
- Kingdom: Animalia
- Phylum: Arthropoda
- Class: Insecta
- Order: Diptera
- Family: Tachinidae
- Subfamily: Tachininae
- Tribe: Palpostomatini
- Genus: Gonzalezodoria; Cortés, 1967

Type species
- Gonzalezodoria goniodes Cortés, 1967

Genus of flies

Gonzalezodoria is a genus of flies in the family Tachinidae.

== Species ==
- Gonzalezodoria goniodes Cortés, 1971

== Distribution ==
Chile
