= Apalpostoma =

Scientific classification
- Kingdom: Animalia
- Phylum: Arthropoda
- Clade: Pancrustacea
- Class: Insecta
- Order: Diptera
- Family: Tachinidae
- Subfamily: Tachininae
- Tribe: Palpostomatini
- Genus: Apalpostoma; Malloch, 1930

Type species
- Apalpostoma cinerea Malloch, 1930

Genus of flies

Apalpostoma is a genus of flies in the family Tachinidae.

== Species ==
- Apalpostoma cinereum Malloch, 1930

== Distribution ==
Australia
