= Eutrixoides =

Scientific classification
- Kingdom: Animalia
- Phylum: Arthropoda
- Class: Insecta
- Order: Diptera
- Family: Tachinidae
- Subfamily: Tachininae
- Tribe: Palpostomatini
- Genus: Eutrixoides; Walton, 1913

Type species
- Eutrixoides jonesii Walton, 1913

Genus of flies

Eutrixoides is a genus of flies in the family Tachinidae.

== Species ==
- Eutrixoides jonesii Walton, 1913

== Distribution ==
Puerto Rico
