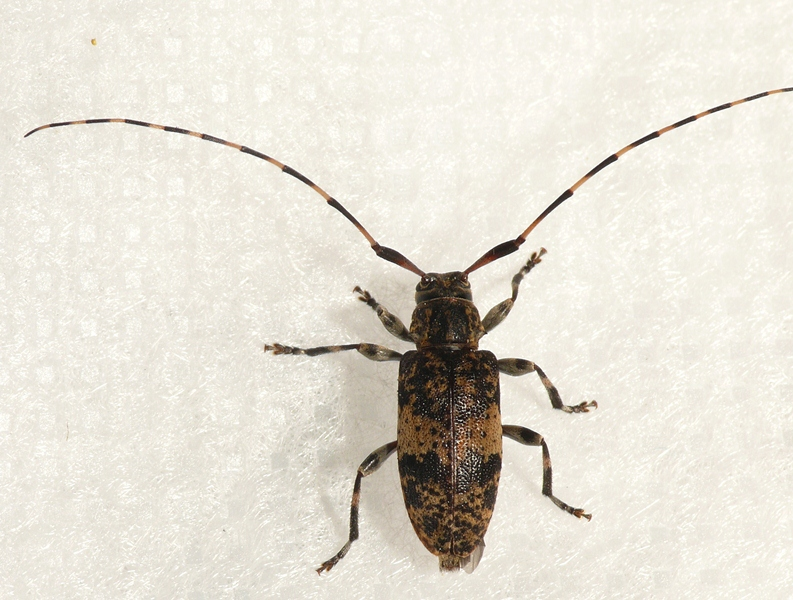

Scientific classification
- Domain: Eukaryota
- Kingdom: Animalia
- Phylum: Arthropoda
- Class: Insecta
- Order: Coleoptera
- Suborder: Polyphaga
- Infraorder: Cucujiformia
- Family: Cerambycidae
- Genus: Leiopus
- Species: L. linnei

Binomial name
- Leiopus linnei Wallin, Nýlander & Kvamme, 2009

= Leiopus linnei =

Species of beetle

Leiopus linnei is a species of beetle in the family Cerambycidae.
