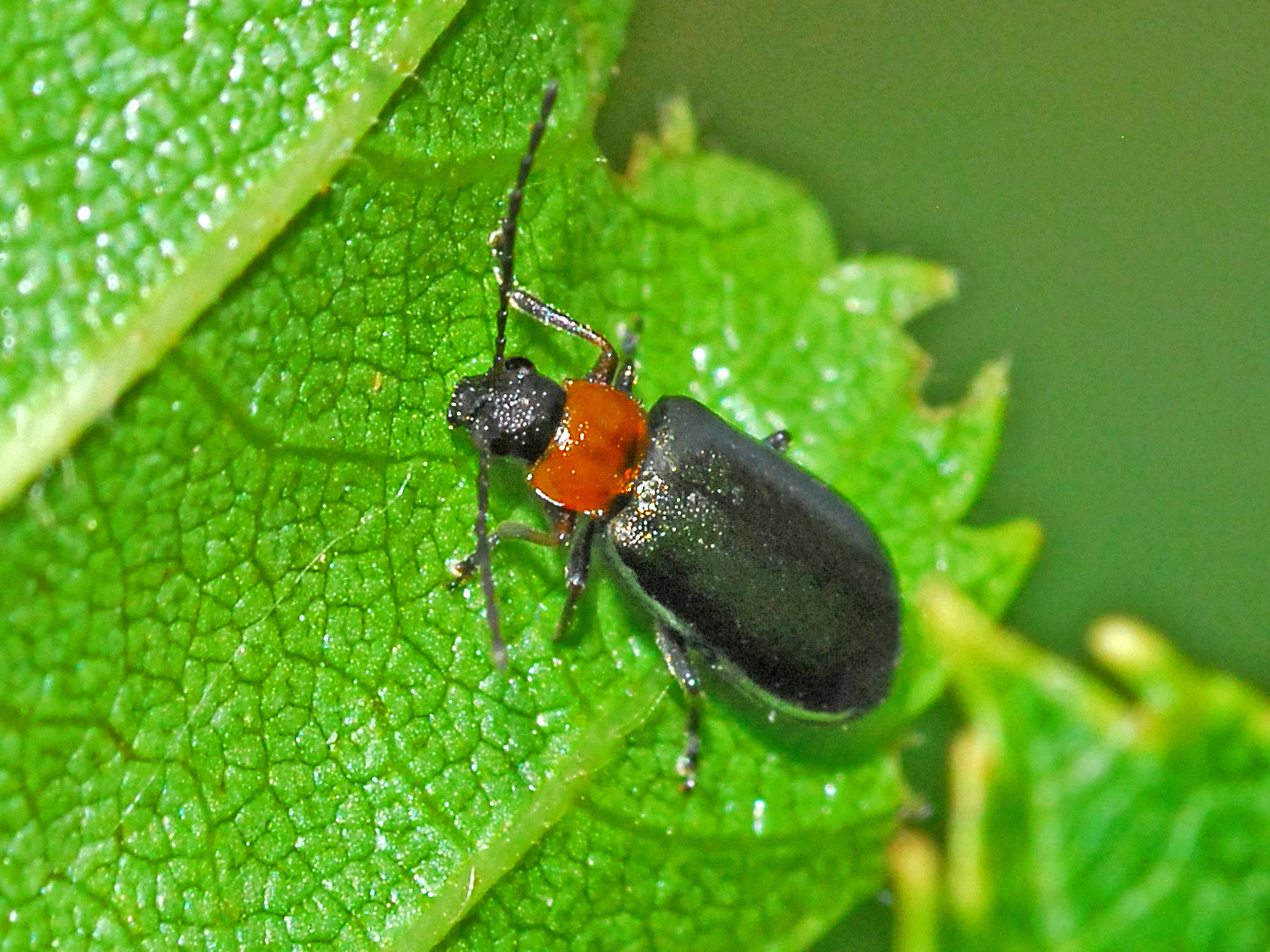
- Female on alder

Scientific classification
- Kingdom: Animalia
- Phylum: Arthropoda
- Class: Insecta
- Order: Coleoptera
- Suborder: Polyphaga
- Infraorder: Cucujiformia
- Family: Chrysomelidae
- Tribe: Luperini
- Subtribe: Luperina
- Genus: Luperus
- Species: L. viridipennis

Binomial name
- Luperus viridipennis Germar, 1824

Synonyms
- Crioceris coerulescens Duftschmidt, 1825

= Luperus viridipennis =

Species of beetle

Luperus viridipennis is a species of skeletonizing leaf beetle belonging to the family Chrysomelidae, subfamily Galerucinae.

== Distribution and habitat ==
This species is mainly present in most of Europe (Austria, Bulgaria, Czech Republic, France, Germany, Hungary, Italy, Poland, Slovakia, Switzerland and Ukraine) and in Central Asia.

These montane beetles occur in the Alps, Carpathians, Balkans, South Urals and in mountains of Central Asia, at an elevation of 1,350–1,600 metres (4,430–5,250 ft) above sea level.

== Description ==
Luperus viridipennis can reach a body length of 3.75–4.15 mm. Males are rather smaller than females. These chrysomelid beetles have punctuated bluish-black elytrae and an orange pronotum. The head shows reddish mandibles and prominent eyes. The first antennal sections and the legs are partly reddish, while the base of femurs and tarsi are brownish.

== Biology ==
Adults can be found from July to August. This polyphagous species parasites various deciduous trees, but lives mainly on alder (mainly on Alnus viridis) and damages their leaves. These beetles can also be found on Betula, Fagus, Ribes andSorbus species. Larvae feed on grass roots. They hibernate as mature larvae.
