= Leiopus syriacus =

Scientific classification
- Kingdom: Animalia
- Phylum: Arthropoda
- Class: Insecta
- Order: Coleoptera
- Suborder: Polyphaga
- Infraorder: Cucujiformia
- Family: Cerambycidae
- Genus: Leiopus
- Species: L. syriacus

Binomial name
- Leiopus syriacus Ganglbauer, 1884

Species of beetle

Leiopus syriacus is a species of longhorn beetles of the subfamily Lamiinae. It was described by Ludwig Ganglbauer in 1884, and is known from Syria, Turkey, and Lebanon. The beetles inhabit deciduous trees, including the walnut species Juglans regia. They measure 6-8 millimetres in length, and can live for approximately 2 years.
