= Thrixionini =

Scientific classification
- Kingdom: Animalia
- Phylum: Arthropoda
- Class: Insecta
- Order: Diptera
- Family: Tachinidae
- Subfamily: Exoristinae
- Tribe: Thrixionini; Townsend, 1913

Tribe of flies

Thrixionini is a tribe of flies in the family Tachinidae.

== Genera ==
- Thrixion Brauer & von Berganstamm, 1889
