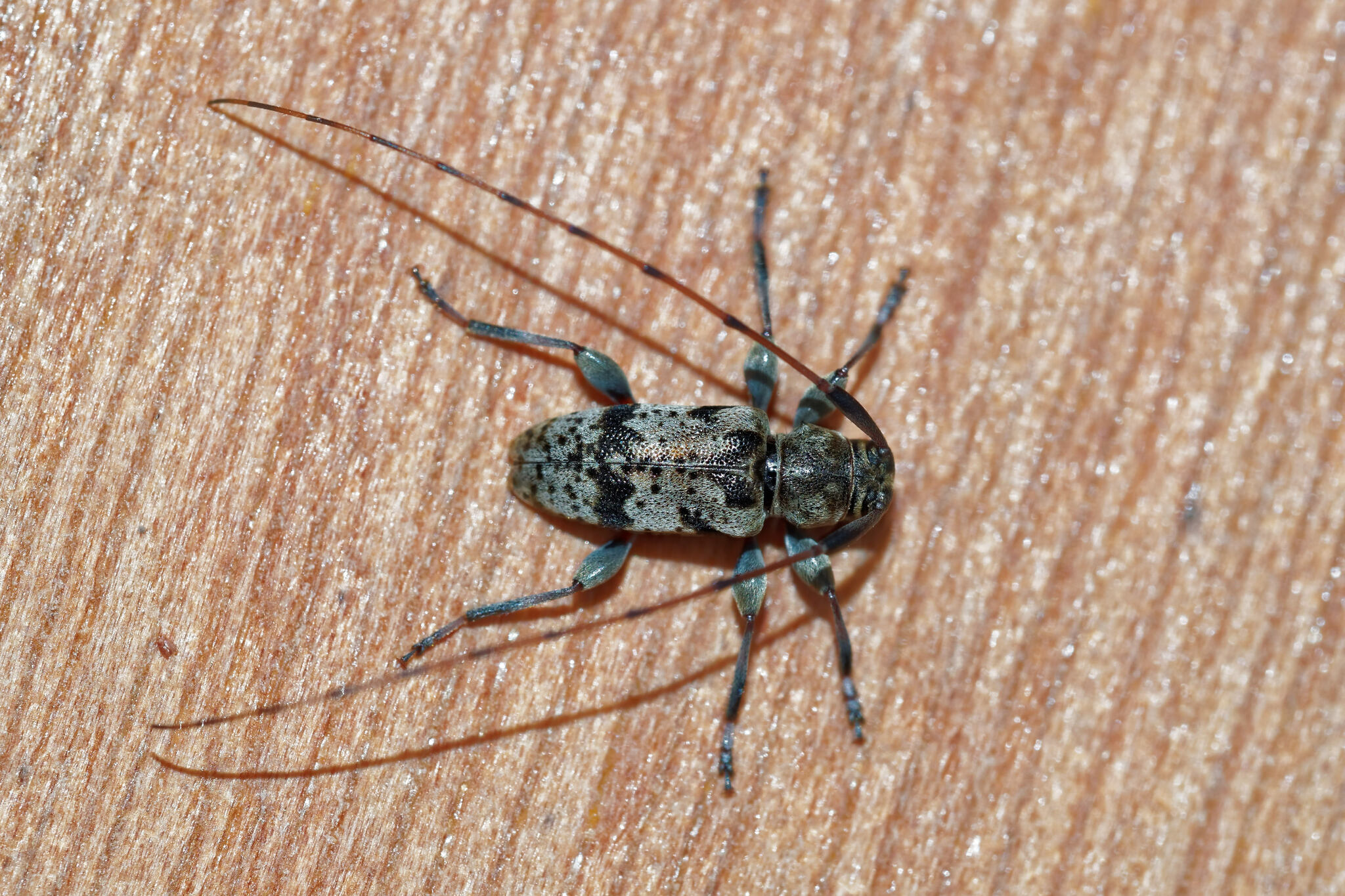

Scientific classification
- Kingdom: Animalia
- Phylum: Arthropoda
- Clade: Pancrustacea
- Class: Insecta
- Order: Coleoptera
- Suborder: Polyphaga
- Infraorder: Cucujiformia
- Family: Cerambycidae
- Genus: Leiopus
- Species: L. femoratus

Binomial name
- Leiopus femoratus Fairmaire, 1859

= Leiopus femoratus =

Species of beetle

Leiopus femoratus is a species of longhorn beetles of the subfamily Lamiinae. It was described by Fairmaire in 1859, and is known from Bulgaria, the Caucasus, France, northern Iran, southern Russia, and Turkey. The beetles inhabit a variety of deciduous trees, including those in the genera Castanea, Carpinus, Juglans, Ficus, and Tilia. They measure 5-8 millimetres in length, and can live for approximately 1–2 years.
