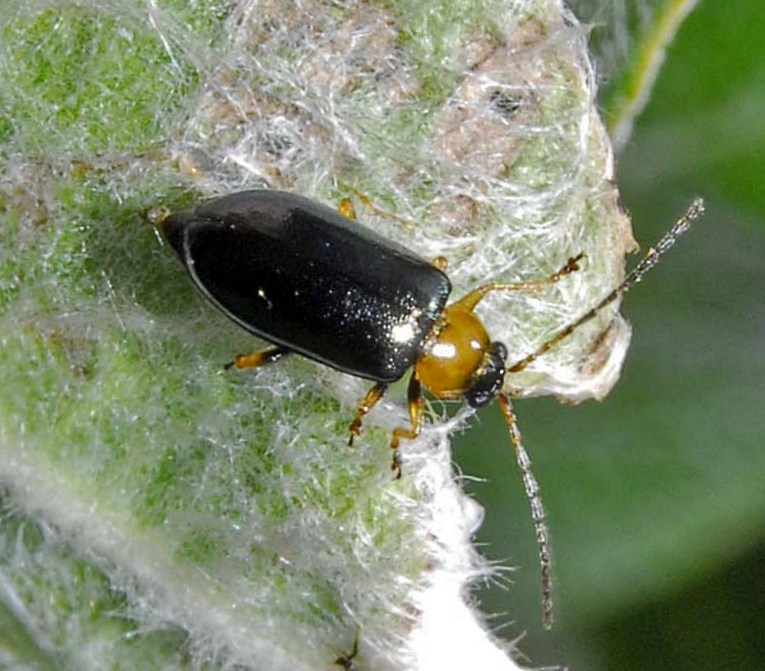

Scientific classification
- Kingdom: Animalia
- Phylum: Arthropoda
- Class: Insecta
- Order: Coleoptera
- Suborder: Polyphaga
- Infraorder: Cucujiformia
- Family: Chrysomelidae
- Tribe: Luperini
- Subtribe: Luperina
- Genus: Luperus
- Species: L. flavipes

Binomial name
- Luperus flavipes (Linnaeus, 1767)

Synonyms
- Chrysomela flavipes Linnaeus, 1767; Chrysomela ochropus Gmelin, 1790; Luperus carniolicus Kiesenwetter, 1861

= Luperus flavipes =

Species of beetle

Luperus flavipes is a species of skeletonizing leaf beetle belonging to the family Chrysomelidae, subfamily Galerucinae.

== Distribution ==
This species can be found in most of Europe and in the Near East.

== Description ==
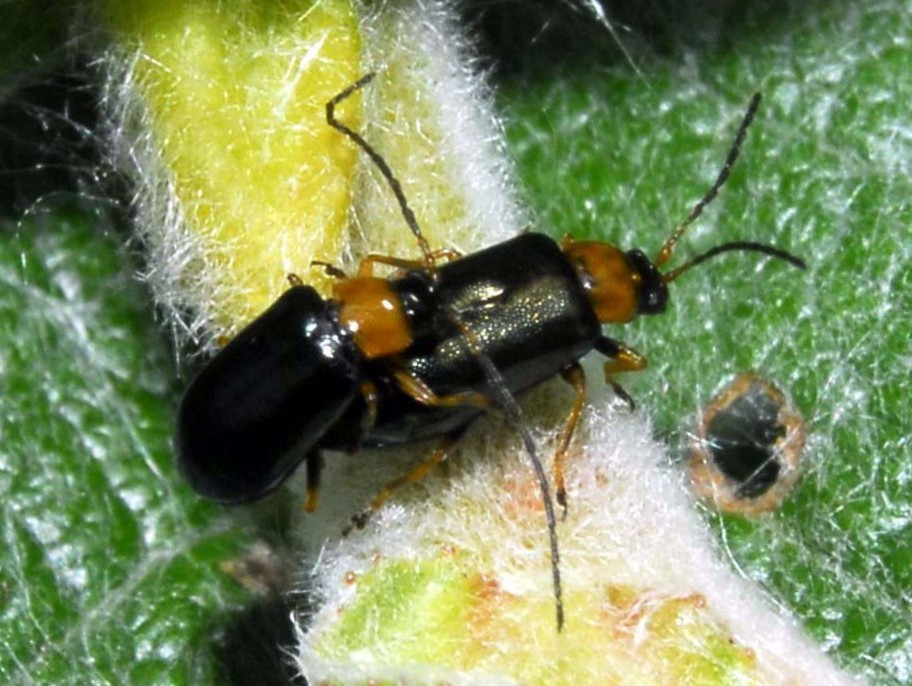
Mating pair

Luperus flavipes can reach a length of 3.5–5 mm. The head and the elytra are bright black, while the legs are bright yellow (hence the species name flavipes), with tibiae darkened towards the tip. The antennae are rather dark, long and wire-shaped, but the first segments are brighter yellow. The antennae are very long in males, shorter in the females. The pronotum is yellow orange. The body is quite tall and vaulted, the sides of the body are almost parallel but slightly wider at the back.

== Biology ==
Adult beetles feed on leaves of broadleaved trees. They are mainly associated with beech, birch, alder, hawthorn, oaks, elm and hazel.

Overwintering takes place in the larval stage, as development is completed in the spring. The sexually mature beetles (imago) can be found in the middle of summer.
