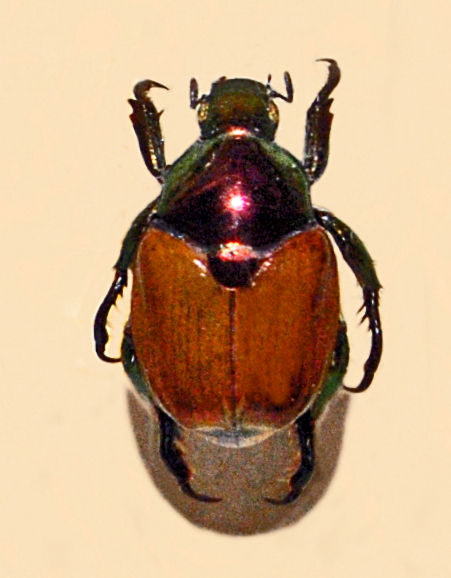
- Popillia cupricollis from Sikkim

Scientific classification
- Kingdom: Animalia
- Phylum: Arthropoda
- Clade: Pancrustacea
- Class: Insecta
- Order: Coleoptera
- Suborder: Polyphaga
- Infraorder: Scarabaeiformia
- Family: Scarabaeidae
- Genus: Popillia
- Species: P. cupricollis

Binomial name
- Popillia cupricollis Hope, 1831

Synonyms
- Popillia hilaris Burmeister, 1855; Popillia hirta Lin 1987; Popillia formosa Hope, 1831; Popillia smaragdula Hope, 1831; Popillia suturata Hope, 1831; Popillia caschmirensis Kollar & Redtenbacher, 1848

= Popillia cupricollis =

Species of beetle

Popillia cupricollis is a species of scarab beetles.

== Description ==
Popillia cupricollis can reach a length of about 11–12 millimetres (0.43–0.47 in). Body is smooth and elongate in shape with quite stout black legs. Pronotum is shining metallic blackish with coppery reflections (hence the Latin species name cupricollis meaning coppery neck), while elytra are orange. The punctures at the sides of pronotum are coarse and strong.

== Distribution and habitat ==
This species can be found in India, in the Himalayan moist temperate forest, at an elevation of 1,400–1,600 metres (4,600–5,200 ft) above sea level.
