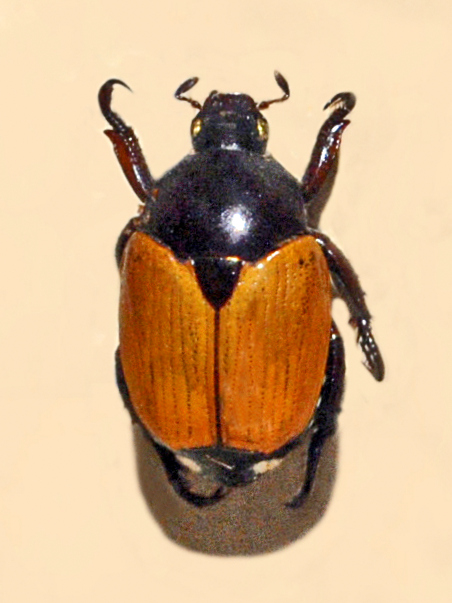
- Popillia bipunctata from Mozambique

Scientific classification
- Kingdom: Animalia
- Phylum: Arthropoda
- Clade: Pancrustacea
- Class: Insecta
- Order: Coleoptera
- Suborder: Polyphaga
- Infraorder: Scarabaeiformia
- Family: Scarabaeidae
- Genus: Popillia
- Species: P. bipunctata

Binomial name
- Popillia bipunctata Fabricius, 1787

Synonyms
- Popillia apicalis Kraatz, 1892; Popillia limbata Boheman, 1857; Scarabaeus punctulatus Linnaeus, 1790

= Popillia bipunctata =

Species of beetle

Popillia bipunctata, the yellow shining leaf chafer, is a species of scarab beetle.

== Description ==
Body length 14 mm, smooth and elongate in shape with quite stout black legs. Pronotum is shining black, while elytra are orange.

== Distribution ==
This species has an afrotropical distribution range (East Africa, Ethiopia, Cape, Congo).
