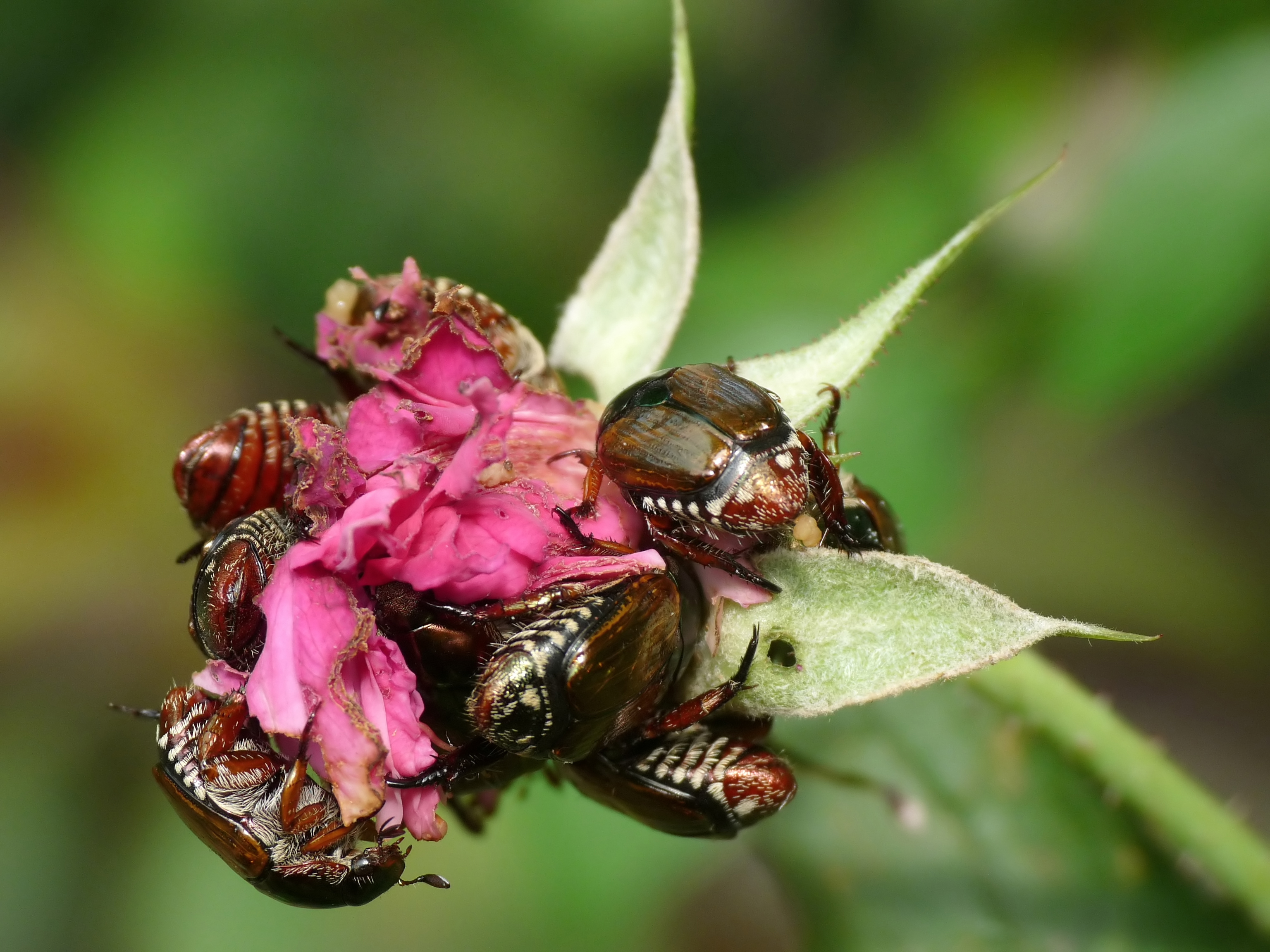
- Popillia sp.

Scientific classification
- Kingdom: Animalia
- Phylum: Arthropoda
- Clade: Pancrustacea
- Class: Insecta
- Order: Coleoptera
- Suborder: Polyphaga
- Infraorder: Scarabaeiformia
- Family: Scarabaeidae
- Tribe: Anomalini
- Genus: Popillia; Serville, 1825

Species
- See text

= Popillia =

Genus of beetles

Popillia is a genus of scarab beetles. The most familiar species is the Japanese beetle (P. japonica) which is responsible for crop losses around the world, and is near the top of the insect pest lists year after year.

== Species ==
- Popillia acuta
- Popillia adamas
- Popillia aenea
- Popillia aeneipennis
- Popillia aenescens
- Popillia albertina
- Popillia amabilis
- Popillia amitina
- Popillia andamanica
- Popillia angeli
- Popillia angolana
- Popillia angulicollis
- Popillia anomaloides
- Popillia anthracina
- Popillia ardoini
- Popillia atra
- Popillia atrocoerulea
- Popillia aurora
- Popillia avita
- Popillia baliana
- Popillia barbellata
- Popillia barrei
- Popillia basilewskyi
- Popillia baugneei
- Popillia beniana
- Popillia benitensis
- Popillia bennigseni
- Popillia bhutanensis
- Popillia bhutanica
- Popillia biguttata
- Popillia biimpressa
- Popillia bipunctata
- Popillia birmanica
- Popillia bisignata
- Popillia bitacta
- Popillia bogdanovi
- Popillia bouyeri
- Popillia brancucci
- Popillia browni
- Popillia bruersi
- Popillia brunnicollis
- Popillia burgeoni
- Popillia callewaerti
- Popillia callipyga
- Popillia cameruna
- Popillia camiadei
- Popillia candezei
- Popillia cerchnopyga
- Popillia cerinimaculata
- Popillia chalcocnemis
- Popillia chalcocnemisoides
- Popillia chinensis
- Popillia chirindana
- Popillia chlorion
- Popillia clypealis
- Popillia coerulea
- Popillia comma
- Popillia complanata
- Popillia congrex
- Popillia constanti
- Popillia constantioides
- Popillia cornelli
- Popillia costalis
- Popillia costipennis
- Popillia crassiuscula
- Popillia crenatipennis
- Popillia cribricollis
- Popillia cuprascens
- Popillia cupricollis
- Popillia cupripes
- Popillia curtipennis
- Popillia cyanea
- Popillia dajaka
- Popillia daliensis
- Popillia decellei
- Popillia decoenei
- Popillia demeyeri
- Popillia deplanata
- Popillia desfontainei
- Popillia desprogesi
- Popillia dichroa
- Popillia difficilis
- Popillia digennaroi
- Popillia dilutipennis
- Popillia discalis
- Popillia discissa
- Popillia distigma
- Popillia distinguenda
- Popillia dives
- Popillia djallonensis
- Popillia donckieri
- Popillia dorsigera
- Popillia dorsofasciata
- Popillia drumonti
- Popillia ducatrix
- Popillia eduardina
- Popillia ertli
- Popillia erythropus
- Popillia eximia
- Popillia expalescens
- Popillia faida
- Popillia fallaciosa
- Popillia felix
- Popillia felschei
- Popillia femoralis
- Popillia feroni
- Popillia fimbripes
- Popillia flavitarsis
- Popillia flavofasciata
- Popillia flavosellata
- Popillia flavotrabeata
- Popillia flexuosa
- Popillia foveicollis
- Popillia fukiensis
- Popillia gabonensis
- Popillia gedongensis
- Popillia gemma
- Popillia gerialis
- Popillia ghanaensis
- Popillia ghesquierei
- Popillia graminea
- Popillia graueri
- Popillia hainanensis
- Popillia hassoni
- Popillia hexaspila
- Popillia hilaris
- Popillia hirta
- Popillia hirtiventris
- Popillia hirtypyga
- Popillia histeroidea
- Popillia hymenalis
- Popillia hypselotropis
- Popillia imitans
- Popillia impressipyga
- Popillia insularis
- Popillia intermedia
- Popillia interpunctata
- Popillia isabellae
- Popillia iwasei
- Popillia jadoti
- Popillia japonica
- Popillia jolyi
- Popillia kanarensis
- Popillia kerkhofi
- Popillia kiwuana
- Popillia kolbei
- Popillia kolleri
- Popillia kraatzi
- Popillia laetans
- Popillia laevicollis
- Popillia laevis
- Popillia laeviscutula
- Popillia laevistriata
- Popillia lasiopyga
- Popillia latecostata
- Popillia latimaculata
- Popillia legalli
- Popillia leleupi
- Popillia lemoulti
- Popillia leonardi
- Popillia leptotarsa
- Popillia lerui
- Popillia lewisi
- Popillia ligulata
- Popillia limbatipennis
- Popillia lineata
- Popillia linpingi
- Popillia liturata
- Popillia livida
- Popillia longula
- Popillia lucida
- Popillia luteipennis
- Popillia macgregori
- Popillia maclellandi
- Popillia macularia
- Popillia mairessi
- Popillia manni
- Popillia marginicollis
- Popillia matertera
- Popillia maynei
- Popillia medleri
- Popillia meinhardti
- Popillia melanochlora
- Popillia melanoloma
- Popillia membranifera
- Popillia merkli
- Popillia migliaccioi
- Popillia miniatipennis
- Popillia minuta
- Popillia mokana
- Popillia molirensis
- Popillia mongolica
- Popillia morettoi
- Popillia mpalainensis
- Popillia muelleri
- Popillia mutabilis
- Popillia mutans
- Popillia nagaii
- Popillia nasuta
- Popillia nathani
- Popillia niijimae
- Popillia nitida
- Popillia njamensis
- Popillia nottrotti
- Popillia nubeculosa
- Popillia nyassica
- Popillia obliterata
- Popillia octogona
- Popillia ohausi
- Popillia opaca
- Popillia ovata
- Popillia oviformis
- Popillia oxypyga
- Popillia pachycnema
- Popillia parvula
- Popillia patkiana
- Popillia patricia
- Popillia petrarcai
- Popillia piattellai
- Popillia pilicollis
- Popillia pilicrus
- Popillia pilosa
- Popillia plagiata
- Popillia plagicollis
- Popillia planiuscula
- Popillia plifera
- Popillia princeps
- Popillia proneptis
- Popillia propinqua
- Popillia psilopyga
- Popillia pui
- Popillia pulchra
- Popillia pulchripes
- Popillia puncticollis
- Popillia pustulata
- Popillia quadriguttata
- Popillia quelpartiana
- Popillia revirescens
- Popillia ricchiardii
- Popillia richteri
- Popillia robichei
- Popillia rothschildti
- Popillia rotundata
- Popillia ruandana
- Popillia rubescens
- Popillia rubripes
- Popillia rubromaculata
- Popillia rufipes
- Popillia runsorica
- Popillia sabatinelli
- Popillia sandyx
- Popillia sankuruensis
- Popillia sanmenensis
- Popillia sauteri
- Popillia sauvageae
- Popillia scabricollis
- Popillia schenkeli
- Popillia schiltzi
- Popillia schizonycha
- Popillia schultzei
- Popillia scutellata
- Popillia sebastiani
- Popillia semiaenea
- Popillia semicuprea
- Popillia sequax
- Popillia serena
- Popillia seydeli
- Popillia sichuanensis
- Popillia signifera
- Popillia sikkimensis
- Popillia simlana
- Popillia smaragdina
- Popillia soror
- Popillia soulai
- Popillia spinipennis
- Popillia spinosa
- Popillia spoliata
- Popillia strigicollis
- Popillia strumifera
- Popillia subquadrata
- Popillia sulcata
- Popillia sulcipennis
- Popillia sumatrensis
- Popillia suturalis
- Popillia symmetrica
- Popillia taiwana
- Popillia tandallae
- Popillia testaceipennis
- Popillia timoriensis
- Popillia transversa
- Popillia trichiopyga
- Popillia trichocnemis
- Popillia tricholopha
- Popillia tristicula
- Popillia tullia
- Popillia uchidai
- Popillia ugandana
- Popillia uhligi
- Popillia ukambana
- Popillia unguicularis
- Popillia usanguana
- Popillia variabilis
- Popillia varicollis
- Popillia varicolor
- Popillia vastipes
- Popillia werneri
- Popillia versicolorea
- Popillia vignai
- Popillia vingerhoedti
- Popillia violaceipennis
- Popillia viridiaurata
- Popillia viridicyanea
- Popillia viridipes
- Popillia viridula
- Popillia viskensi
- Popillia wittmeri
- Popillia yacouba
- Popillia zerchei
