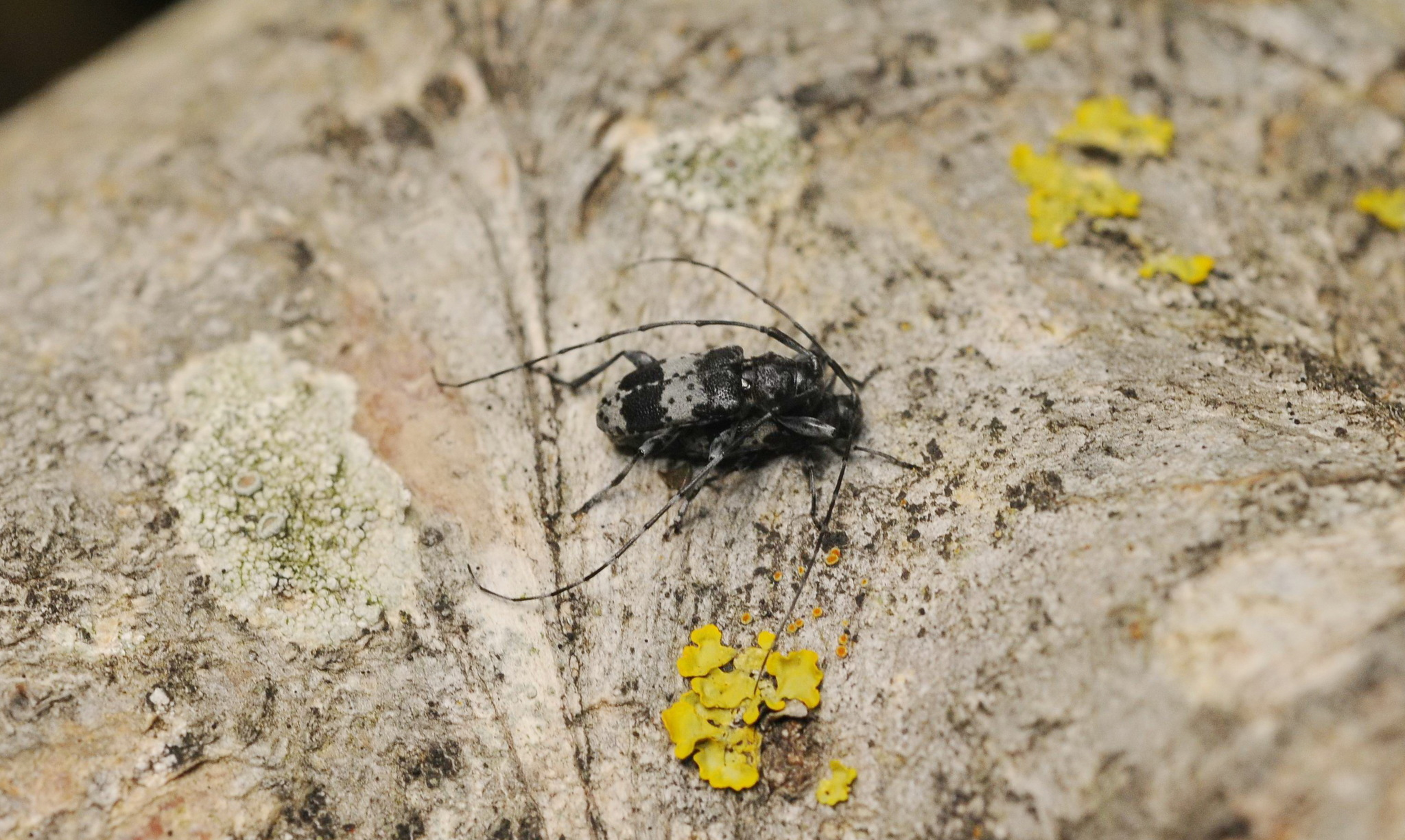

Scientific classification
- Kingdom: Animalia
- Phylum: Arthropoda
- Clade: Pancrustacea
- Class: Insecta
- Order: Coleoptera
- Suborder: Polyphaga
- Infraorder: Cucujiformia
- Family: Cerambycidae
- Genus: Leiopus
- Species: L. punctulatus

Binomial name
- Leiopus punctulatus (Paykull, 1800)

= Leiopus punctulatus =

Species of beetle

Leiopus punctulatus is a species of longhorn beetles of the subfamily Lamiinae. It was described by Paykull in 1800, and is known from Europe. The beetles measure 6-8 millimetres in length, and can live for approximately 1–2 years. They inhabit poplar trees, especially the white poplar, but also Populus tremula and Populus nigra. The species is endangered in Central Europe due to a decrease in the white poplar population.
