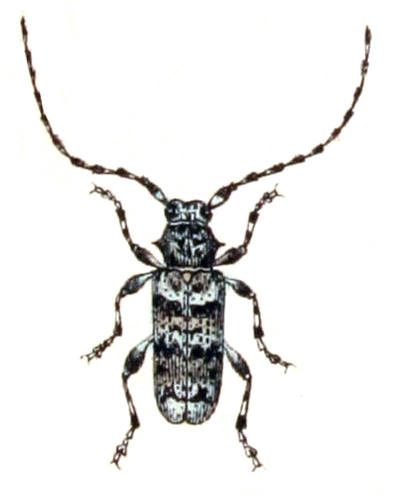
- Leiopus nebulosus

Scientific classification
- Domain: Eukaryota
- Kingdom: Animalia
- Phylum: Arthropoda
- Class: Insecta
- Order: Coleoptera
- Suborder: Polyphaga
- Infraorder: Cucujiformia
- Family: Cerambycidae
- Tribe: Acanthocinini
- Genus: Leiopus

= Leiopus =

Genus of beetle

Leiopus is a genus of longhorn beetles of the subfamily Lamiinae.

== Species ==
- Leiopus femoratus Fairmaire, 1859
- Leiopus kharazii Holzschuh, 1974
- Leiopus linnei Wallin, 2009
- Leiopus nebulosus
- Leiopus punctulatus (Paykull, 1800)
- Leiopus syriacus Ganglbauer, 1884
