= Leiopus kharazii =

Scientific classification
- Domain: Eukaryota
- Kingdom: Animalia
- Phylum: Arthropoda
- Class: Insecta
- Order: Coleoptera
- Suborder: Polyphaga
- Infraorder: Cucujiformia
- Family: Cerambycidae
- Genus: Leiopus
- Species: L. kharazii

Binomial name
- Leiopus kharazii Holzschuh, 1974

Species of beetle

Leiopus kharazii is a species of longhorn beetles of the subfamily Lamiinae. It was described by Holzschuh in 1974, and is known from Azerbaijan (including Talysh) and northern Iran. The beetles inhabit deciduous trees. They measure 6-10 millimetres in length, and can live for approximately 1–2 years.
