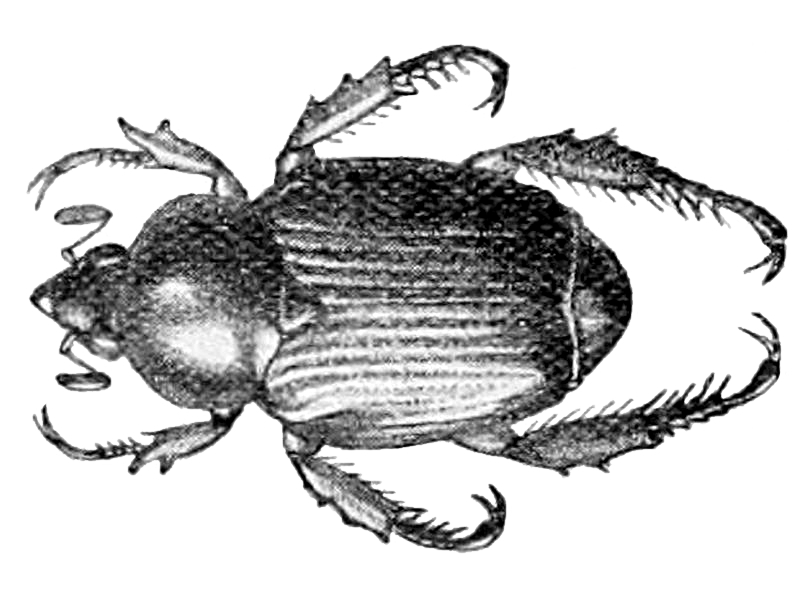

Scientific classification
- Kingdom: Animalia
- Phylum: Arthropoda
- Clade: Pancrustacea
- Class: Insecta
- Order: Coleoptera
- Suborder: Polyphaga
- Infraorder: Scarabaeiformia
- Family: Scarabaeidae
- Genus: Popillia
- Species: P. acuta

Binomial name
- Popillia acuta Newman, 1838

= Popillia acuta =

Species of beetle

Popillia acuta is a species of beetle that was described by Edward Newman in 1838. It has been debated whether or not P. acuta is the same species as P. nasuta. It is found in Southwestern India and the East Indies.

== Description ==
Adults have a bright and coppery-gold-green body with castaneous antennae. Its clypeus is acute, prolonged, and turned upwards and its elytra testaceous with a bright and metallic lustre. Their terminal segments are gold-green and individuals are about .45 inches (1.1 cm) long and .275 inches (0.70 cm) wide.
