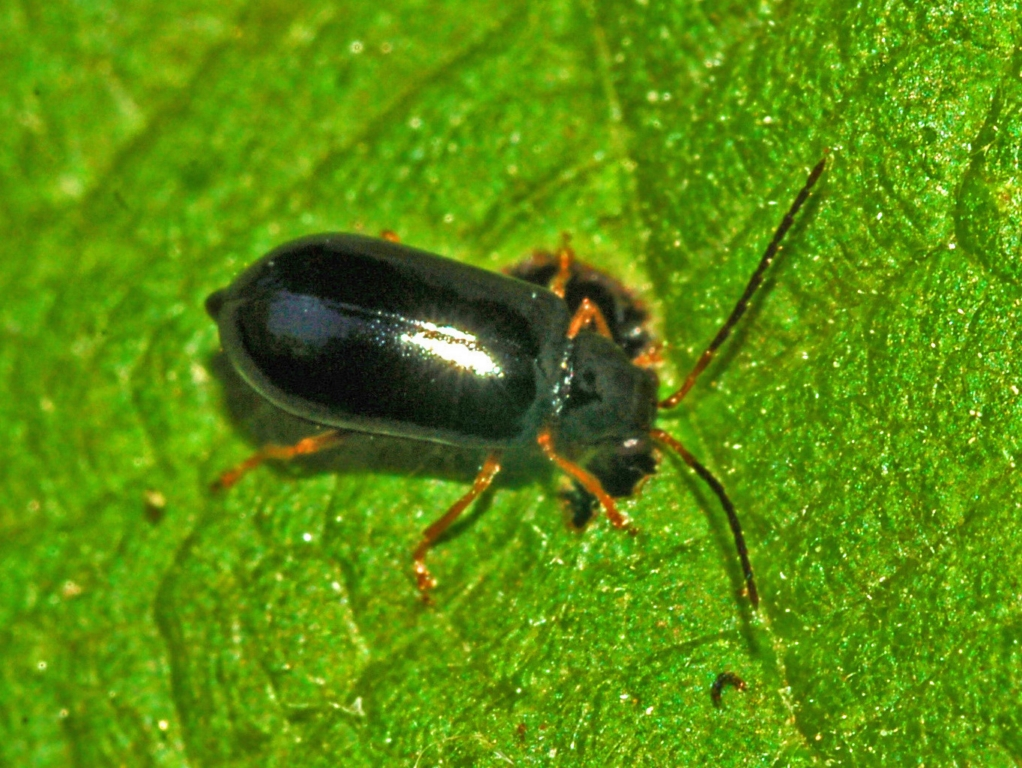

Scientific classification
- Kingdom: Animalia
- Phylum: Arthropoda
- Class: Insecta
- Order: Coleoptera
- Suborder: Polyphaga
- Infraorder: Cucujiformia
- Family: Chrysomelidae
- Tribe: Luperini
- Subtribe: Luperina
- Genus: Luperus
- Species: L. longicornis

Binomial name
- Luperus longicornis (Fabricius, 1781)

Synonyms
- Luperus betulinus (de Joannis, 1865)

= Luperus longicornis =

Species of beetle

Luperus longicornis is a skeletonizing leaf beetle belonging to the family Chrysomelidae, subfamily Galerucinae. The species was first described by Johan Christian Fabricius in 1781.

== Distribution ==
This species can be found in the whole Palearctic realm and in the Near East.

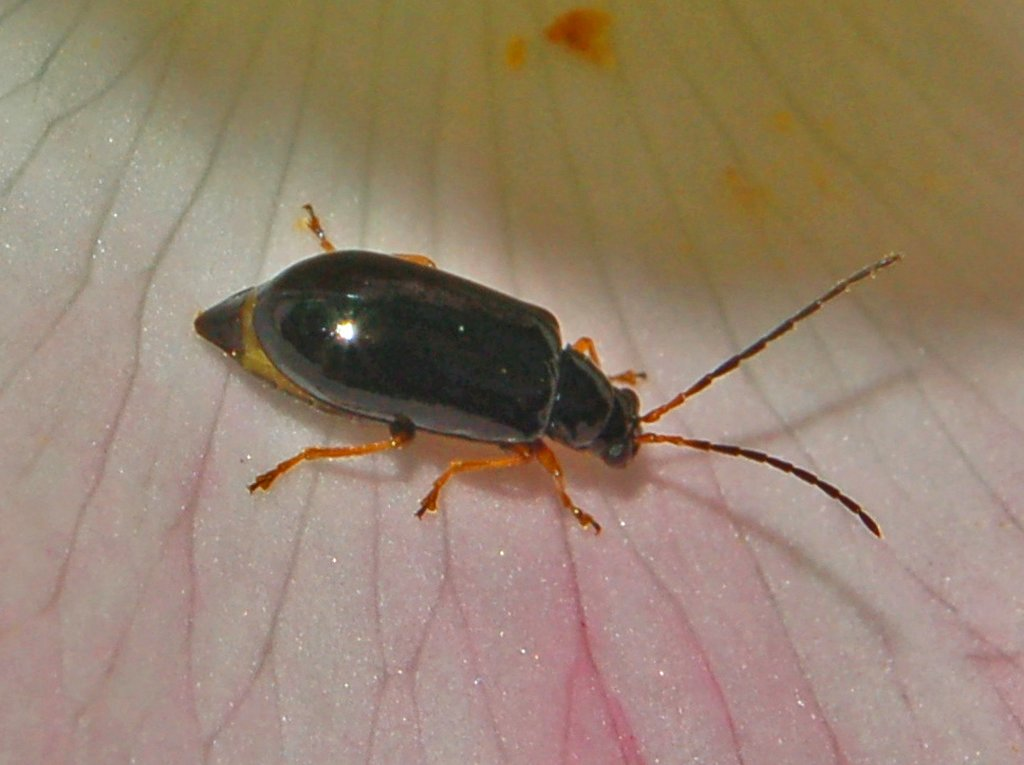
Female

== Description ==
Luperus longicornis can reach a body length of about 4–5 mm (0.16–0.20 in). These beetles have black bodies and orange legs. The males generally have longer antennae than their female counterparts.

== Biology ==
The larvae feed on grass roots and pass winter in the larval stage, as development is completed in the spring. Adults mainly feed on leaves of willows (Salix species) and birch, but also on Rosaceae species and on foliage of several trees (Populus tremula, Quercus robur, etc.).
