= Thrixion =

Scientific classification
- Kingdom: Animalia
- Phylum: Arthropoda
- Class: Insecta
- Order: Diptera
- Family: Tachinidae
- Subfamily: Exoristinae
- Tribe: Thrixionini
- Genus: Thrixion; Brauer & von Berganstamm, 1889

Type species
- Phytomyptera aberrans Schiner, 1861

Genus of flies

Thrixion is a genus of flies in the family Tachinidae.

== Species ==
- Thrixion aberrans (Schiner, 1861)
- Thrixion pilifrons Mesnil, 1963
