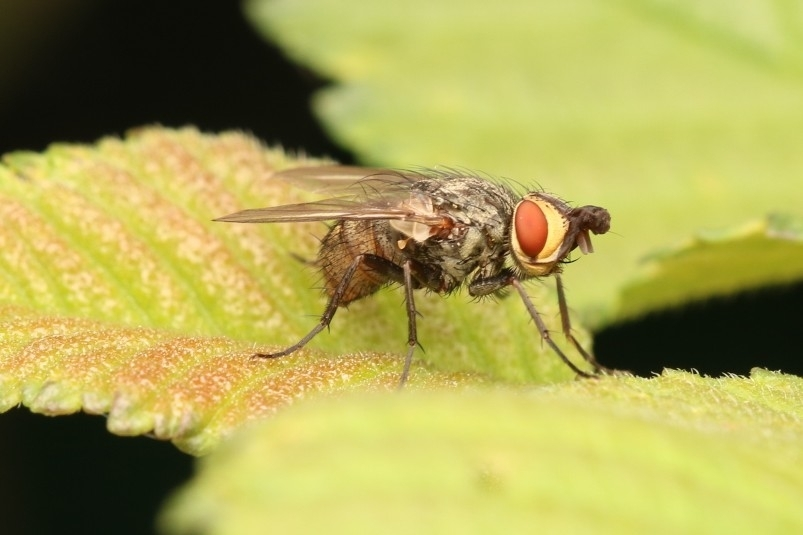

Scientific classification
- Kingdom: Animalia
- Phylum: Arthropoda
- Clade: Pancrustacea
- Class: Insecta
- Order: Diptera
- Family: Tachinidae
- Subfamily: Exoristinae
- Tribe: Blondeliini
- Genus: Istocheta
- Species: I. aldrichi

Binomial name
- Istocheta aldrichi (Mesnil, 1953)

Synonyms
- Centeter cinerea Aldrich, 1923; Hyperecteina aldrichi Mesnil, 1953

= Istocheta aldrichi =

Species of fly

Istocheta aldrichi or winsome fly is a species of fly in the family Tachinidae. Originally from Japan, it has been introduced in North America in 1922 as a biocontrol to combat the Japanese beetle (Popillia japonica). It is established in northeastern North America, including Canada and the USA. Larvae pupate inside the host beetle after hatching from an egg laid on the beetle's pronotum. Historical host range catalogues and recently collected crowdsourced data suggests that this fly is highly specific to Japanese beetle and probably does not attack other beetle species.

== Distribution ==
Canada, United States, Japan, Korean Peninsula, Russia, Taiwan.
