= Palpostomatini =

Scientific classification
- Kingdom: Animalia
- Phylum: Arthropoda
- Class: Insecta
- Order: Diptera
- Family: Tachinidae
- Subfamily: Tachininae
- Tribe: Palpostomatini

Tribe of flies

Palpostomatini is a tribe of flies in the family Tachinidae.

== Genera ==
- Apalpostoma Malloch, 1930
- Eustacomyia Malloch, 1927
- Eutrixa Coquillett, 1897
- Eutrixoides Walton, 1913
- Eutrixopsis Townsend, 1919
- Gonzalezodoria Cortés, 1967
- Hamaxia Walker, 1860Walker, 1860
- Hamaxiella Mesnil, 1967
- Isidotus Reinhard, 1962
- Neoxanthobasis Blanchard, 1966
- Palpostoma Robineau-Desvoidy, 1830
- Paraxanthobasis Blanchard, 1966
- Peristasisea Villeneuve, 1934
- Tachinoestrus Portschinsky, 1887
- Xanthobasis Aldrich, 1934
- Xanthooestrus Villeneuve, 1914
- Zamimus Malloch, 1932
