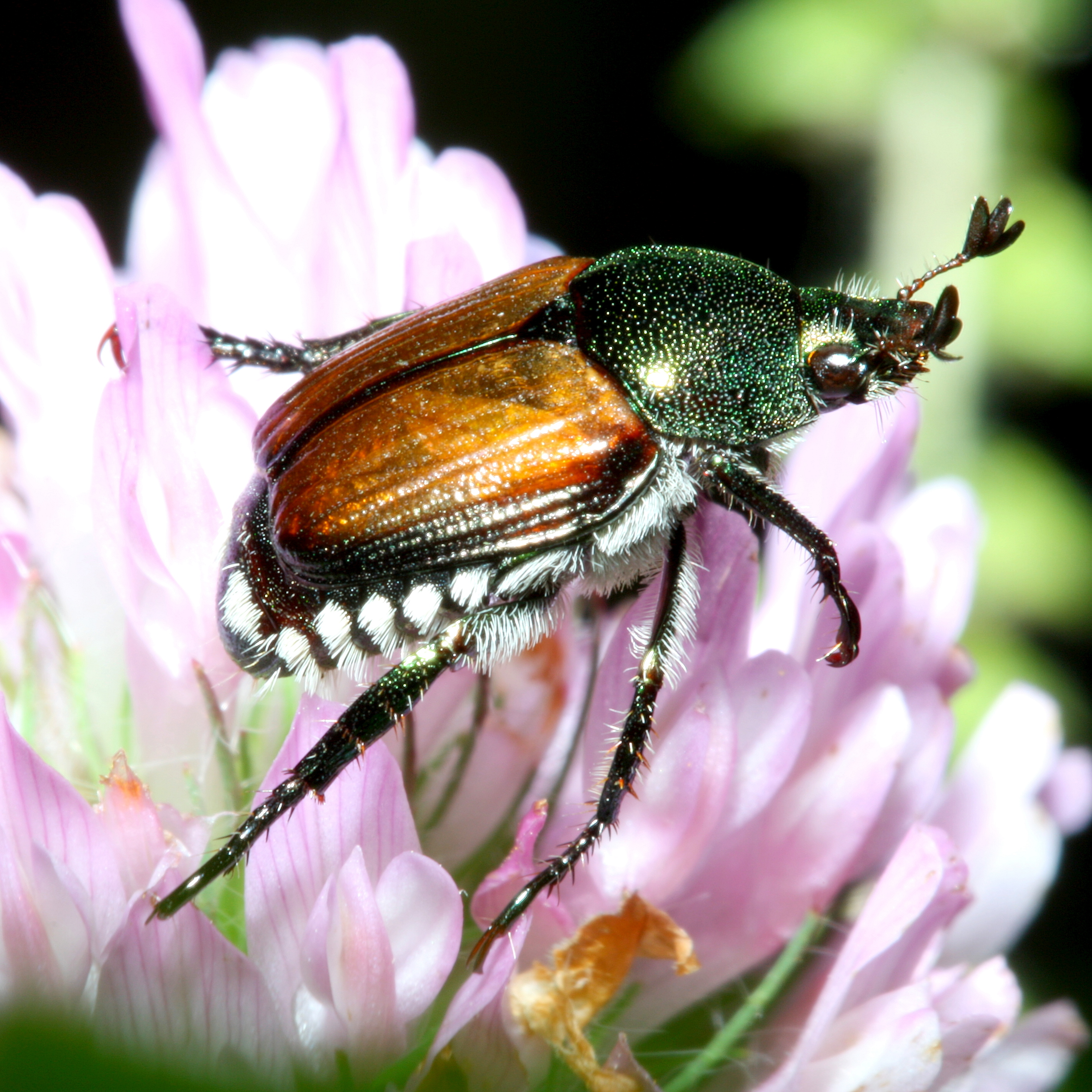

Scientific classification
- Kingdom: Animalia
- Phylum: Arthropoda
- Clade: Pancrustacea
- Class: Insecta
- Order: Coleoptera
- Suborder: Polyphaga
- Infraorder: Scarabaeiformia
- Family: Scarabaeidae
- Genus: Popillia
- Species: P. japonica

Binomial name
- Popillia japonica Newman, 1841

= Japanese beetle =

Species of insect

The Japanese beetle (Popillia japonica) is a species of scarab beetle. Due to the presence of natural predators, the Japanese beetle is not considered a pest in its native Japan. In North America and some regions of Europe, it is a noted pest to roughly 300 species of plants. Some of these plants include roses, grapes, hops, canna, crape myrtles, birch trees, linden trees, and others.

The adult beetles damage plants by skeletonizing the foliage (i.e., consuming only the material between a leaf's veins), as well as, at times, feeding on a plant's fruit. The subterranean larvae feed on the roots of grasses.

== Taxonomy ==
English entomologist Edward Newman described the Japanese beetle in 1841.

== Description ==
Adults of P. japonica measure 15 mm (0.6 in) in length and 10 mm (0.4 in) in width, with iridescent, copper-colored elytra and a green thorax and head. A row of white tufts (spots) of hair projects from under the wing covers on each side of the body. Males are slightly smaller than females. Grubs are white and lie in curled positions. A mature grub is roughly 1 in (2.5 cm) long.

== Distribution ==
Popillia japonica is native to Japan, and is an invasive species in North America and Europe.

The first written evidence of the insect appearing within the United States was in 1916 in a nursery near Riverton, New Jersey. The beetle larvae are thought to have entered the United States in a shipment of iris bulbs prior to 1912, when inspections of commodities entering the country began. As of 2015, just nine western states of the United States—Arizona, California, Colorado, Idaho, Montana, Nevada, Oregon, Utah, and Washington—were considered free of Japanese beetles. These states are protected by a federal Japanese beetle quarantine (7 CFR 301.48) and the National Plant Board's U.S. Domestic Japanese Beetle Harmonization Plan, which is intended to keep them uninfested. Since then, some of these states have detected localized infestations and begun eradication programs: Oregon began treating a large infestation found near Portland in 2016, cutting beetle numbers by about 92% since 2016, and Washington launched a multi-year eradication effort after beetles were found in the Yakima Valley in 2020. These beetles have been detected in airports on the West Coast of the United States since the 1940s. The infestation grew rapidly, and from late June to September 3, 2021, over 20,000 were found in Grandview, Washington, alone.

The first Japanese beetle found in Canada was inadvertently brought by tourists to Yarmouth, Nova Scotia, by ferry from Maine in 1939. During the same year, three additional adults were captured at Yarmouth and three at Lacolle in southern Quebec.

Japanese beetles have been found on the islands of the Azores since the 1970s. In 2014, the first population in mainland Europe was discovered near Milan, Italy. In 2017, the pest was detected in nearby Ticino, Switzerland. In 2023, the first population north of the Alps was detected in Kloten near Zürich, Switzerland.

== Life cycle ==
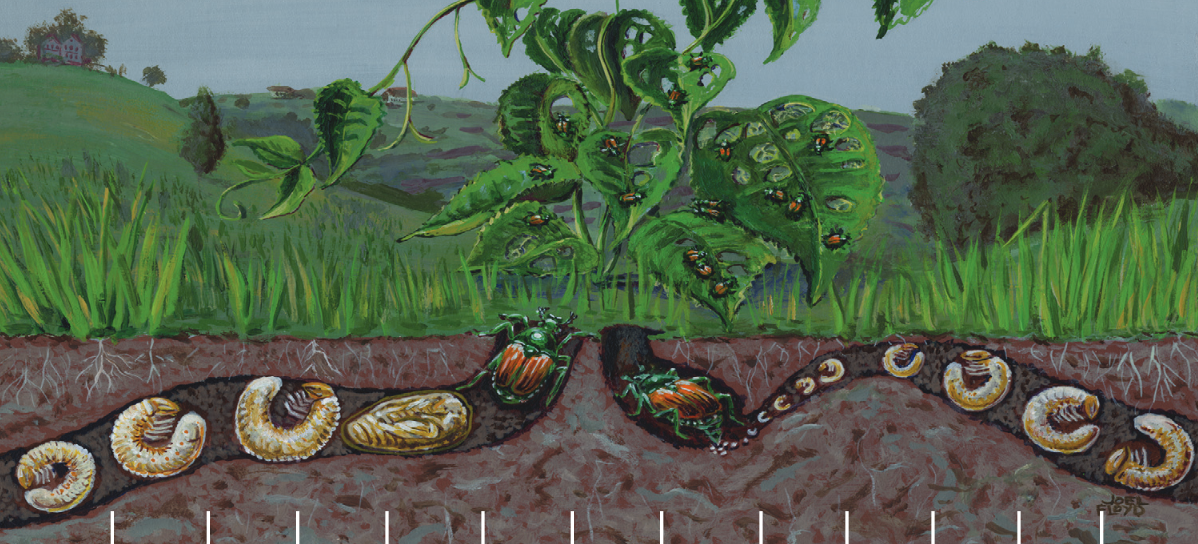
Life cycle of the Japanese beetle: Larvae feed on roots underground, while adults feed on leaves and stems.

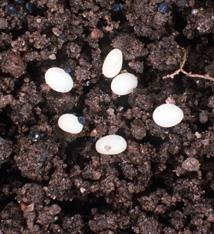
A typical cluster of Japanese beetle eggs

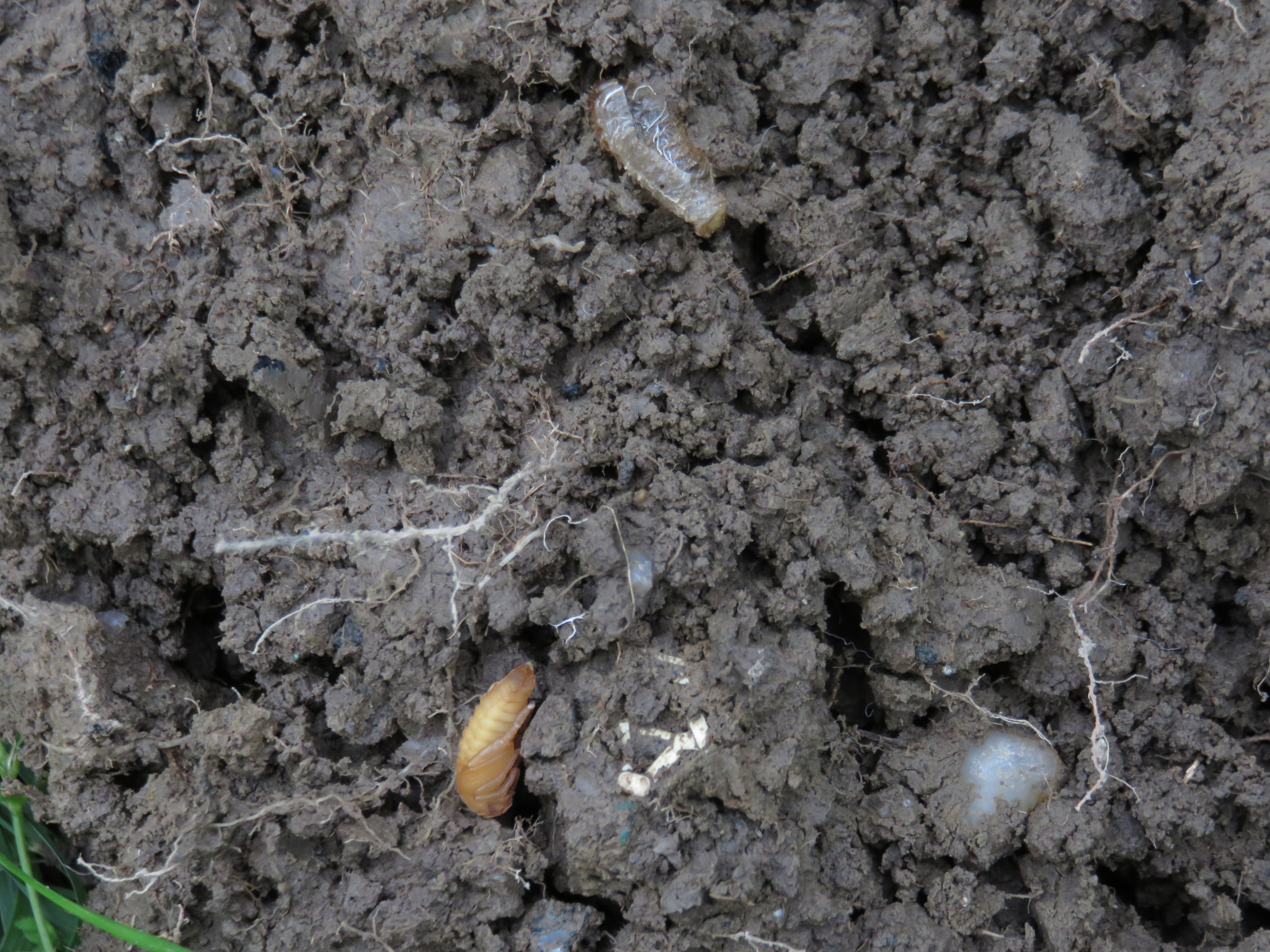
A Japanese beetle pupa shortly after moulting

Eggs are laid individually or in small clusters near the soil surface. Within roughly two weeks, the ova hatch, then the larvae feed on fine roots and other organic material. As the larvae mature, they become C-shaped grubs, which consume progressively coarser roots and may do economic damage to pasture and turf.

Larvae hibernate in small cells in the soil, emerging in the spring when soil temperatures rise again. Within 4–6 weeks of breaking hibernation, the larvae pupate. Most of the beetle's life is spent as a larva, with only 30–45 days spent as an imago. Adults feed on leaf material above ground, using pheromones to attract other beetles and overwhelm plants, skeletonizing leaves from the top of the plant downward. The aggregation of beetles alternates daily between mating, feeding, and ovipositing. An adult female may lay as many as 40–60 ova in her lifetime.

Throughout the majority of the Japanese beetle's range, its lifecycle takes one full year, but in the extreme northern parts of its range, as well as high-altitude zones as found in its native Japan, development may take two years.

== Pest control ==
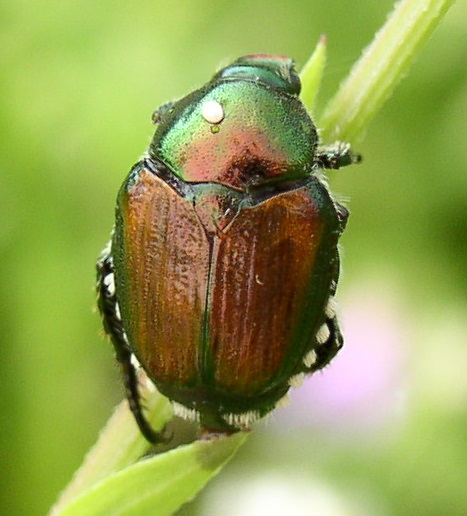
Egg of the tachinid fly Istocheta aldrichi (white) on a Japanese beetle: The fly was introduced from Japan for biocontrol.

Phenological models might be useful in predicting the timing of the presence of larvae or adults of the Japanese beetle. Model outputs can be used to support the timely implementation of monitoring and control actions against the pest, thus reducing its potential impact.

Owing to their destructive nature, traps have been invented specifically to target Japanese beetles. These comprise a pair of crossed walls with a bag or plastic container underneath and are baited with floral scent, pheromone, or both. However, studies conducted at the University of Kentucky and Eastern Illinois University suggest beetles attracted to traps frequently do not end up in the traps; instead, they land on plants in the vicinity and cause more damage along the flight path and near the trap than may have occurred if the trap were not present.

During the larval stage, the Japanese beetle lives in lawns and other grasslands, where it eats the roots of grasses. During that stage, it is susceptible to a fatal disease called milky spore disease, caused by a bacterium called milky spore, Paenibacillus (formerly Bacillus) popilliae. The USDA developed this biological control, and it is commercially available in powder form for application to lawn areas. Standard applications (low density across a broad area) take from two to four years to establish maximal protection against larval survival, expanding through the soil through repeated rounds of infection. Control programs based on milky spore disease have been found to work most efficiently when applied as large-scale treatment programs, rather than by isolated landowners. Bacillus thuringiensis is also used to control Japanese beetle populations in the same manner.

On field crops such as squash, floating row covers can be used to exclude the beetles, but this may necessitate hand pollination of the flowers. Kaolin sprays can also be used as barriers and have been shown to be as effective as standard pesticides programs.

Research performed by many US extension service branches has shown that pheromone traps attract more beetles than they catch; under favorable conditions, only up to three-quarters of the insects attracted to a trap are captured by it. Traps are most effective when spread out over an entire community and downwind and at the borders (i.e., as far away as possible, particularly upwind) of managed property containing plants being protected.

When present in small numbers, the beetles may be manually controlled using a soap-water spray mixture, shaking a plant in the morning hours and disposing of the fallen beetles, or simply picking them off attractions such as rose flowers, since the presence of beetles attracts more beetles to that plant.

Several insect predators and parasitoids have been introduced to the United States for biocontrol. Two of them, the fly Istocheta aldrichi, a parasite of adult beetles, and the solitary wasp Tiphia vernalis, a parasite of larvae, are well established with significant but variable rates of parasitism. T. vernalis reproduces by locating beetle grubs through digging, and on finding one, paralyzing it with a sting and laying an egg on it; on hatching, the wasp larva consumes the grub. I. aldrichi, instead, seeks out adult female beetles and lays eggs on their thoraces, allowing its larvae to burrow into the insect's body and kill it in this manner. A female I. aldrichi can lay up to 100 eggs over two weeks, and the rapidity with which its larvae kill their hosts allows the use of these flies to suppress beetle populations before they can themselves reproduce.

Soil-dwelling entomopathogenic nematodes are known to seek out and prey on Japanese beetle grubs during the subterranean portion of their lifecycle by entering larvae and reproducing within their bodies. Varieties that have seen commercial use as pest-control agents include Steinernema glaseri and Heterorhabditis bacteriophora.

Recent studies have begun to explore a microsporidian pathogen, Ovavesicula popilliae, as a form of biocontrol against Japanese beetles. Initially discovered in 1987, O. popilliae has been observed inhabiting the malpighian tubules of third-instar larvae. This leads to swelling, inefficiency in the gut, and potentially cause microsporidiosis in the infected beetles. This infection weakens the beetle and creates a suitable breeding ground for opportunistic pathogens.

== Host plants ==
While the larvae of Japanese beetles feed on the roots of many genera of grasses, the adults consume the leaves of a much wider range of hosts, including these common crops: bean, cannabis, strawberry, tomato, pepper, grape, hop, rose, cherry, plum, pear, peach, raspberry, blackberry, corn, pea, okra, and blueberry.

=== List of adult beetle host plant genera ===
- Abelmoschus (okra, musk mallow)
- Acer (maple)
- Aesculus (horse chestnut)
- Alcea (hollyhock)
- Aronia
- Asimina (pawpaw)
- Asparagus
- Aster
- Buddleja (butterfly bush)
- Calluna
- Caladium
- Canna
- Cannabis sativa
- Chaenomeles
- Castanea (sweet chestnut)
- Cirsium (thistle)
- Cosmos
- Dahlia
- Daucus (carrot)
- Dendranthema
- Digitalis (foxglove)
- Dioscorea (Yam)
- Dolichos
- Echinacea (coneflower)
- Hemerocallis (daylily)
- Heuchera
- Hibiscus
- Humulus (hop)
- Hydrangea
- Ilex (holly)
- Impatiens
- Ipomoea (sweet potato, morning glory)
- Iris
- Juglans (walnut)
- Lagerstroemia
- Liatris
- Ligustrum (privet)
- Malus (apple, crabapple)
- Malva (mallow)
- Mentha (mint)
- Myrica
- Ocimum (basil)
- Oenothera (evening primrose)
- Parthenocissus
- Phaseolus
- Phlox
- Physocarpus
- Pistacia
- Platanus (plane)
- Polygonum (Japanese knotweed)
- Populus (poplar)
- Prunus (plum, peach, etc.)
- Quercus (oak)
- Ribes (gooseberry, currants, etc.)
- Rheum (rhubarb)
- Rhododendron
- Rosa (rose)
- Rubus (raspberry, blackberry, etc.)
- Salix (willows)
- Sambucus (elder)
- Sassafras
- Solanum (nightshades, including potato, tomato, eggplant)
- Spinacia (spinach)
- Syringa (lilac)
- Thuja (arborvitae)
- Tilia (basswood, linden, UK: lime)
- Toxicodendron (poison oak, poison ivy, sumac)
- Ulmus (elm)
- Vaccinium (blueberry)
- Viburnum
- Vitis (grape)
- Weigelia
- Wisteria
- Zea (maize)
- Zinnia

== Gallery ==
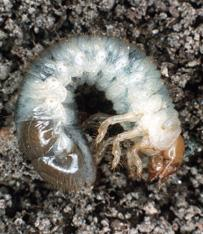
Japanese beetle larva (grub)

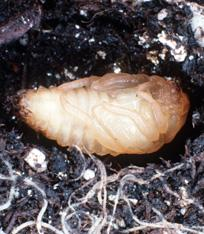
Japanese beetle pupa

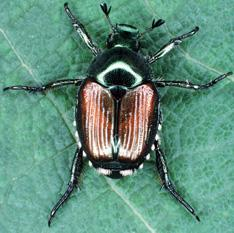
Japanese beetle adult

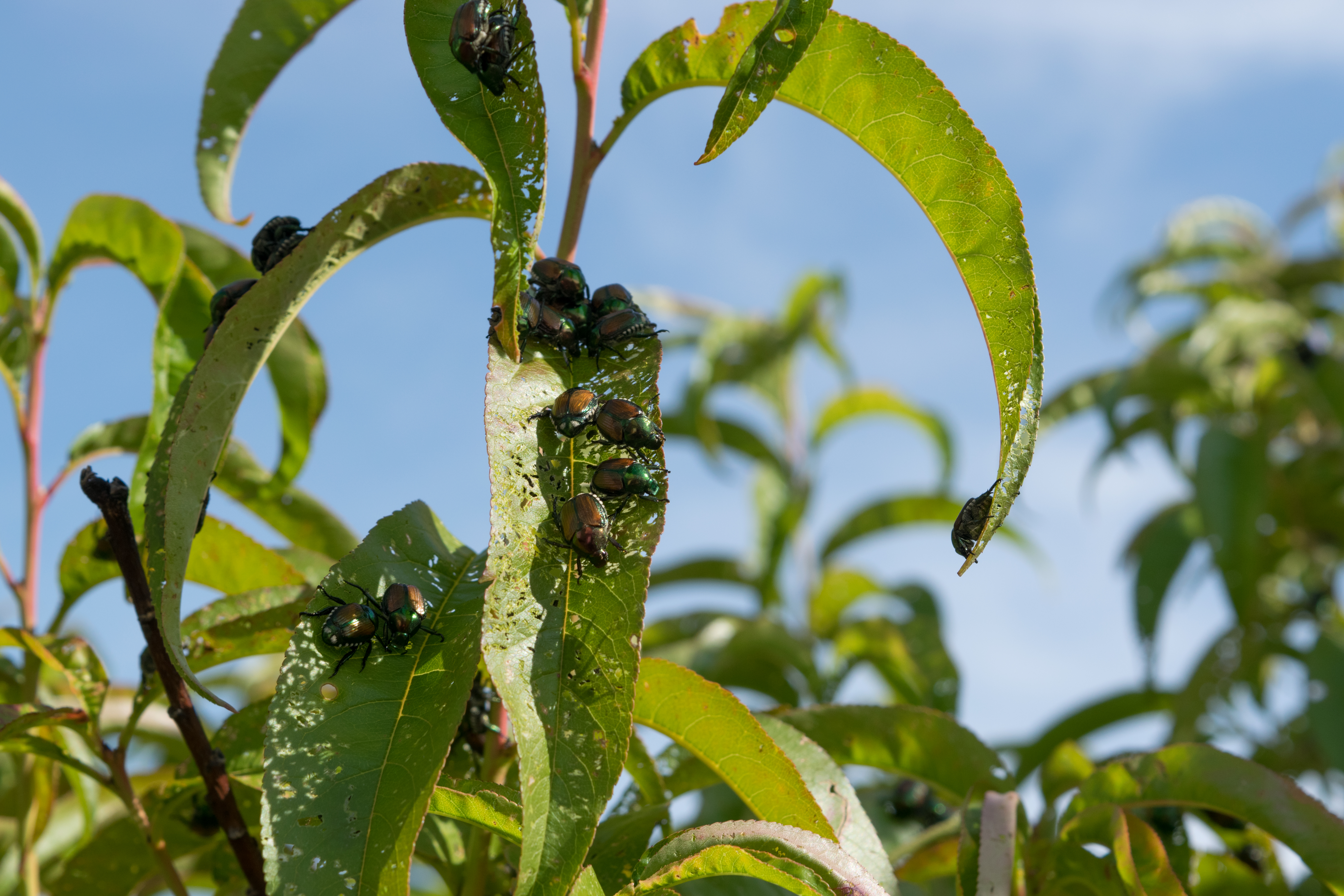
Adult Japanese beetles feeding on a peach tree

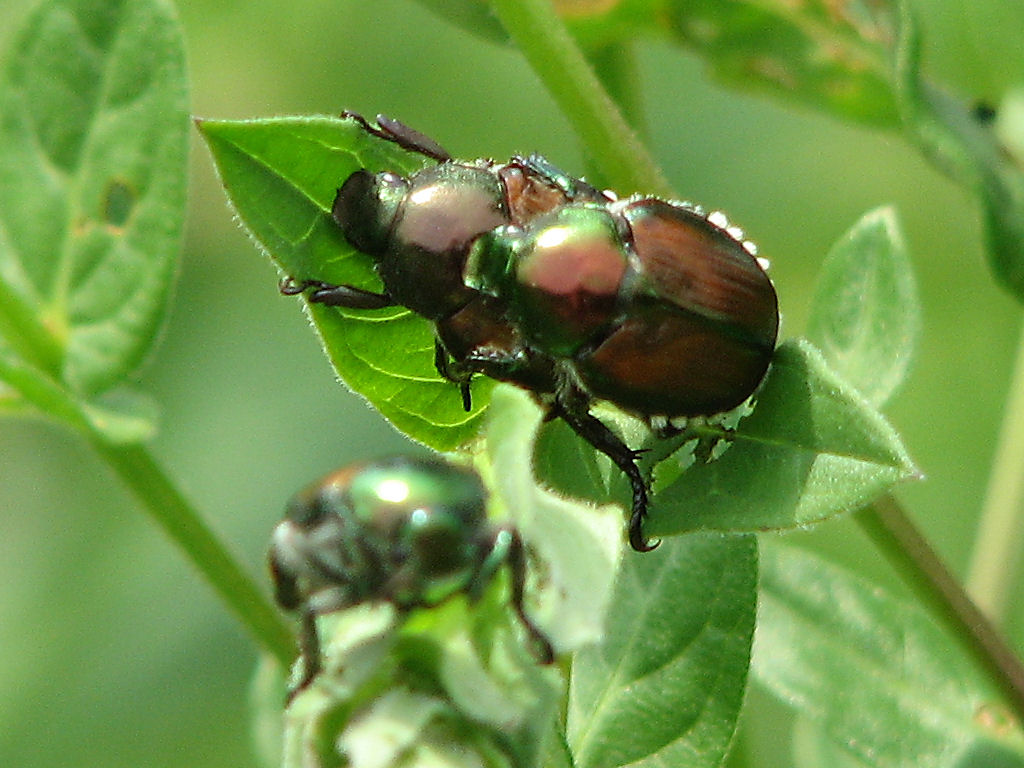
Mating, Ottawa, Ontario, Canada

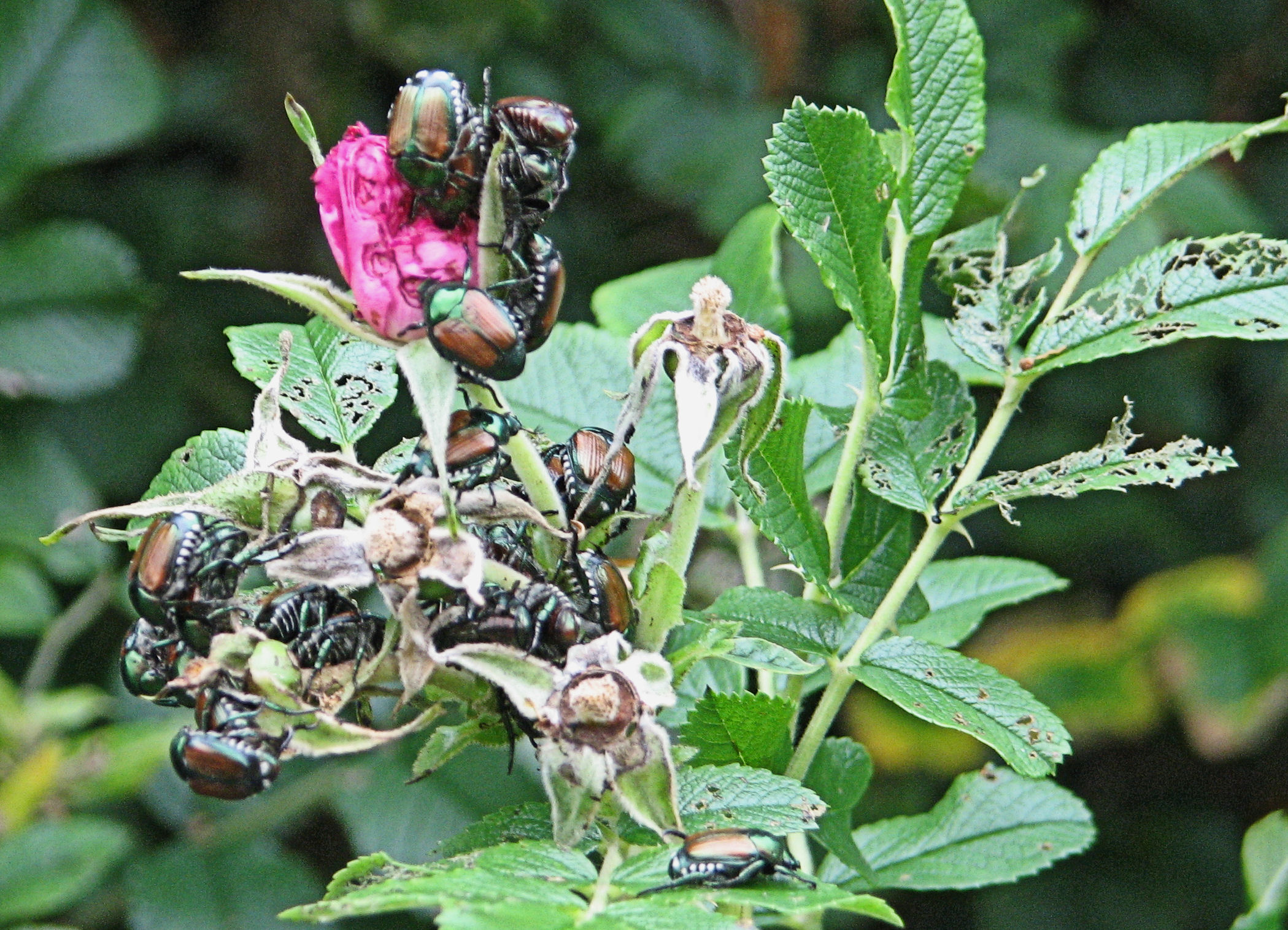
Feeding, Ottawa

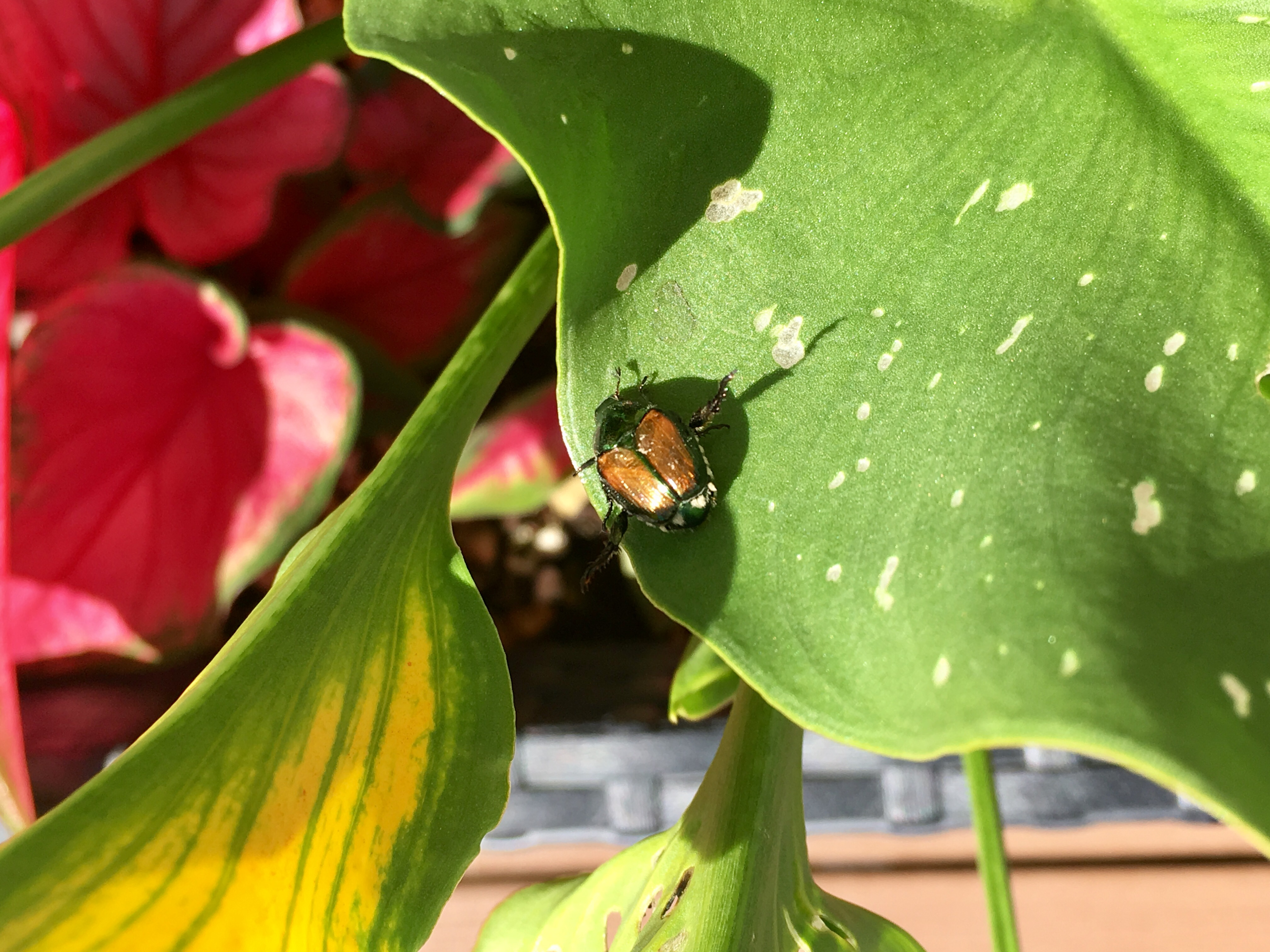
Japanese beetle feeding on calla lily, Ottawa, Ontario, Canada
