= Étienne Louis Geoffroy =

French entomologist and pharmacist

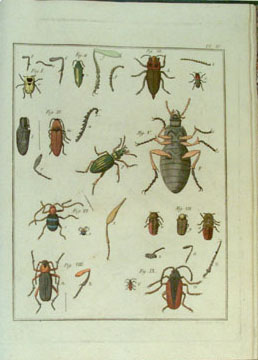
Histoire abrégée des Insectes qui se trouvent aux environs de Paris

Étienne Louis Geoffroy (October 12, 1725 – August 12, 1810) was a French entomologist and pharmacist. He was born in Paris and died in Soissons. He followed the binomial nomenclature of Carl von Linné and devoted himself mainly to beetles.

Geoffroy was the author of Histoire abrégée des Insectes qui se trouvent aux environs de Paris. Paris : Durand Vol. 1 8 + 523 pp. 10 pls (1762) and co-author with Antoine François of Entomologia Parisiensis, sive, Catalogus insectorum quae in agro Parisiensi reperiuntur ... (1785).
