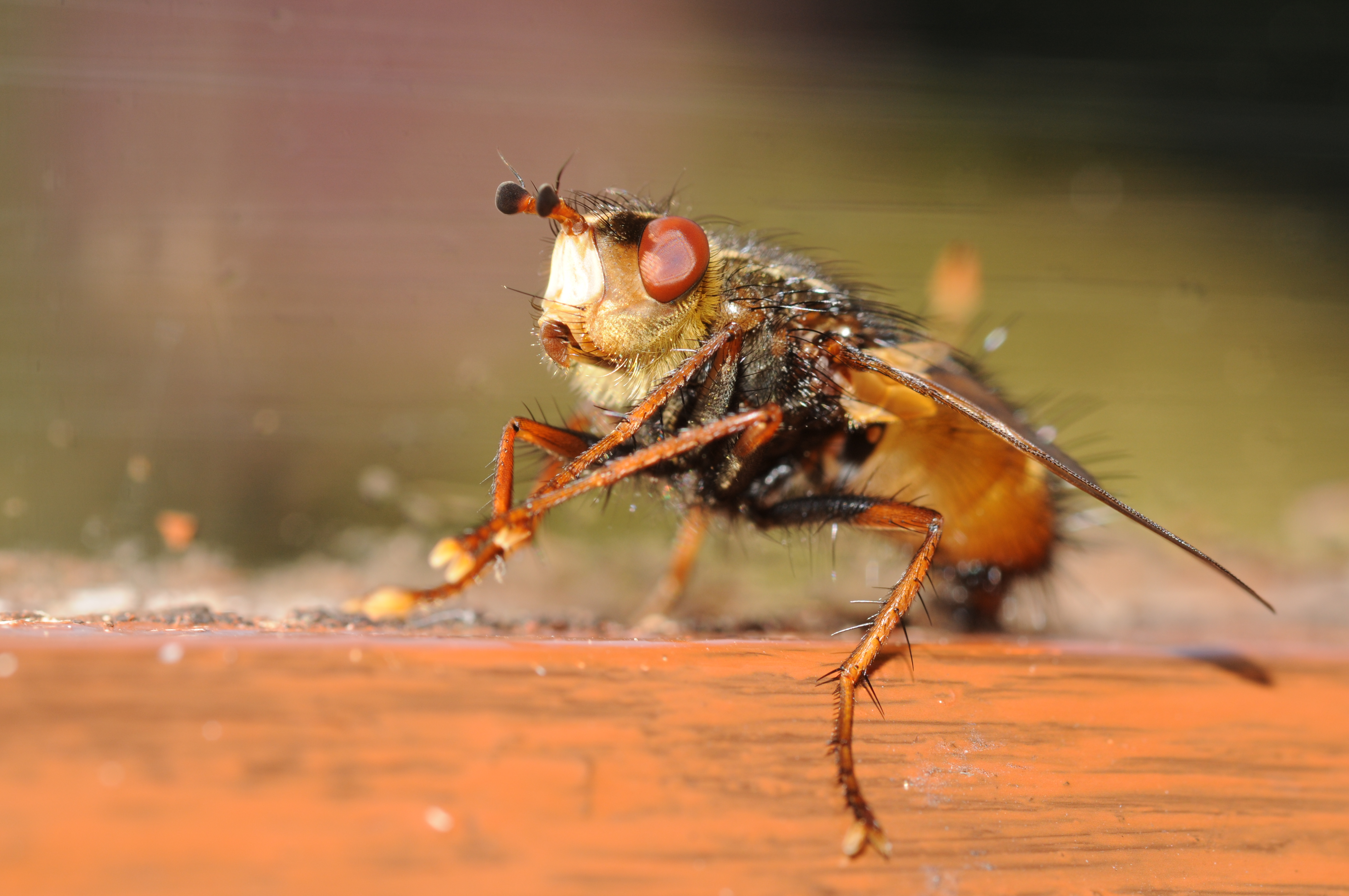
- Tachina fera

Scientific classification
- Kingdom: Animalia
- Phylum: Arthropoda
- Clade: Pancrustacea
- Class: Insecta
- Order: Diptera
- Clade: Eremoneura
- Clade: Cyclorrhapha
- Section: Schizophora
- Subsection: Calyptratae
- Superfamily: Oestroidea
- Family: Tachinidae; Robineau-Desvoidy, 1830

Subfamilies
- Dexiinae; Exoristinae; Phasiinae; Tachininae

Diversity
- 1,523 genera

= Tachinidae =

Tachinidae Temporal range: Eocene–Recent

Family of insects

The Tachinidae are a large and variable family of true flies within the insect order Diptera, with more than 8,200 known species and many more to be discovered. Over 1,300 species have been described in North America alone. Insects in this family commonly are called tachinid flies or simply tachinids. As far as is known, they all are protelean parasitoids, or occasionally parasites, of arthropods, usually other insects. The family is known from many habitats in all zoogeographical regions and is especially diverse in South America.

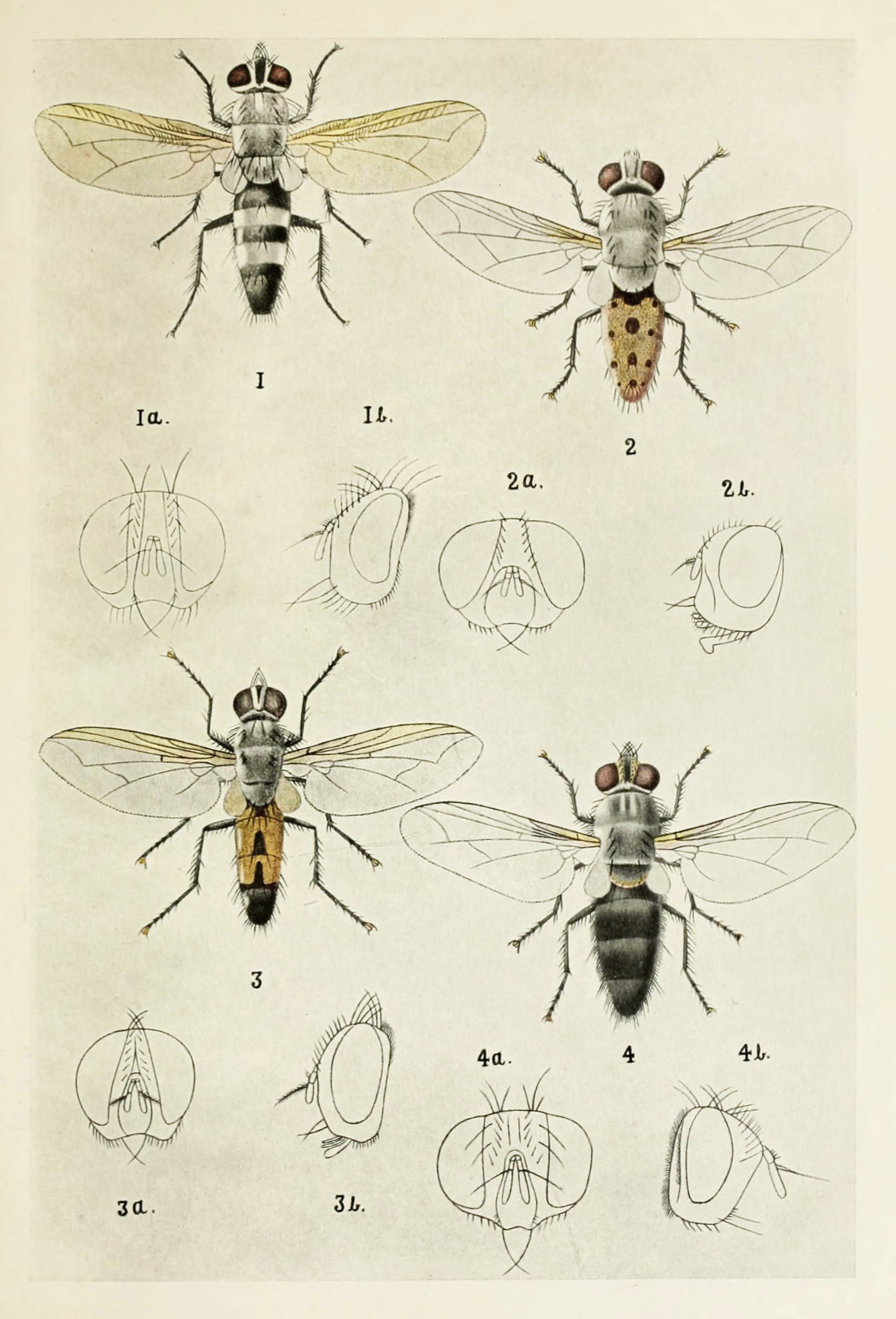
"Tachinidae" by Harold Maxwell-Lefroy, 1909

== Taxonomy ==
Just like that of all Diptera, the taxonomy of Tachinidae is complex. The name Tachinidae was first validly proposed by Robineau-Desvoidy in 1830, but in the form "Tachinariae." Robineau-Desvoidy, 1830 thus has priority despite the name correction, and this applies to Tachinidae (for the family) and to Tachininae (for the subfamily), in accordance with the ICZN rules on the formation of group names (Article 36.1).

There may be confusion between this family name and its homonym used by Fleming in 1921 to describe a family of Coleoptera. The latter usage was invalidated by the ICZN in 1993 (Opinion 1743), which corrected the spelling of Tachinidae Fleming, 1821 (Insecta, Coleoptera) to Tachinusidae to avoid homonymy with Tachinidae Robineau-Desvoidy, 1830 (Insecta, Diptera).

== Life cycle ==
Reproductive strategies vary greatly between tachinid species, largely, but not always clearly, according to their respective life cycles. Many species are generalists rather than specialists. Comparatively few are restricted to a single host species, so there is little tendency towards the close co-evolution one finds in the adaptations of many specialist species to their hosts, such as are typical of protelean parasitoids among the Hymenoptera.

Larvae (maggots) of most members of this family are parasitoids (developing inside a living host, ultimately killing it). In contrast, a few are parasitic (not generally killing the host). Tachinid larvae feed on the host tissues, either after having been injected into the host by the parent, or penetrating the host from outside. Various species have different modes of oviposition and of host invasion. Typically, tachinid larvae are endoparasites (internal parasites) of caterpillars of butterflies and moths, or the eruciform larvae of sawflies. For example, they have been found to lay eggs in African sugarcane borer larva, a species of moth common in sub-Saharan Africa, as well as the more northerly Arctic woolly bear moth. However, some species attack adult beetles and some attack beetle larvae. Others attack various types of true bugs, and others attack grasshoppers; a few even attack centipedes. Also parasitised are bees, wasps and sawflies. Mantodea, Blattodea, Embioptera, Phasmatodea and other Neopterans have been found to be readily parasitized by Tachinids.. Many are polyphagous and can parasitize multiple hosts, as opposed to parasitic wasps and hymenopterans like ichneumons, which are highly specialized.

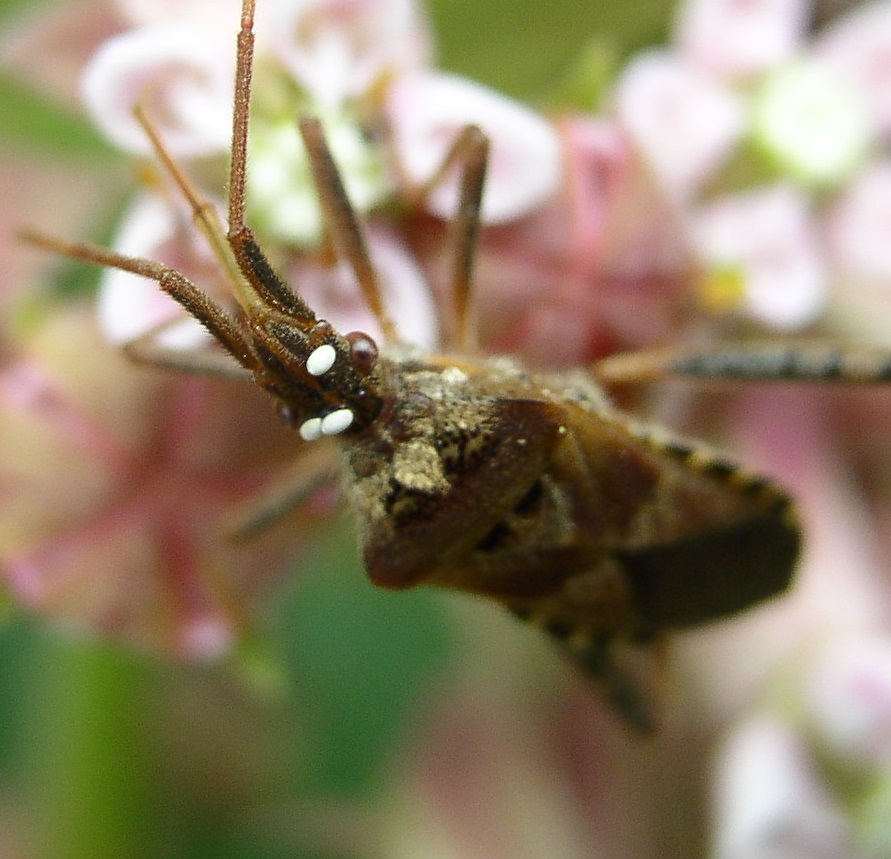
Tachinid eggs (possibly Trichopoda pennipes) on Leptoglossus occidentalis

== Oviposition ==
Probably the majority of female tachinids lay white, ovoid eggs with flat undersides onto the skin of the host insect. Imms mentions the genera Gymnosoma, Thrixion, Winthemia, and Eutachina as examples. In a closely related strategy some genera are effectively ovoviviparous (some authorities prefer the term ovolarviparous) and deposit a hatching larva onto the host. For example, this occurs in Tachinidae species which parasitize the butterfly Danaus chrysippus in Ghana. The free larvae immediately bore into the host's body. Illustrative genera include Exorista and Voria. Many tachinid eggs hatch quickly, having partly developed inside the mother's uterus, which is long and often coiled for retaining developing eggs. However, it is suggested that the primitive state probably is to stick unembryonated eggs to the surface of the host.

Many other species inject eggs into the host's body, using the extensible, penetrating part of their ovipositor, sometimes called the oviscapt, which roughly translates to "egg digger". Species in the genera Ocyptera, Alophora, and Compsilura are examples.

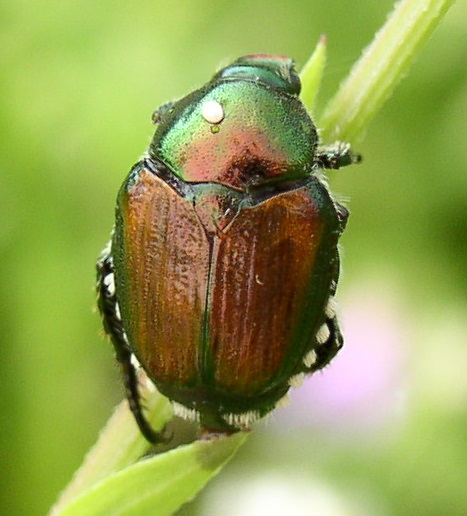
Istocheta aldrichi egg on Popillia japonica (Japanese beetle)

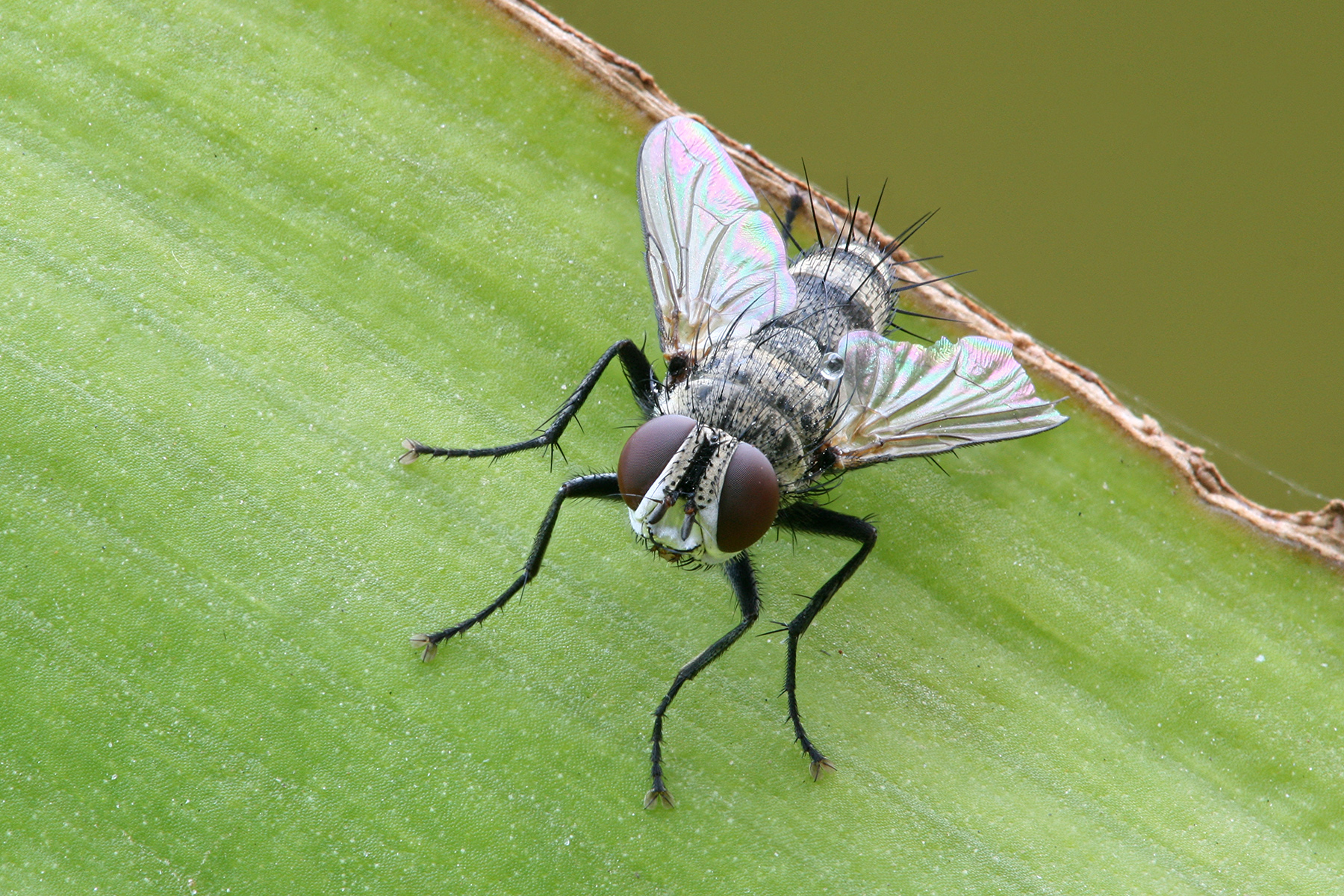
Most tachinids are dull colored, resembling house flies

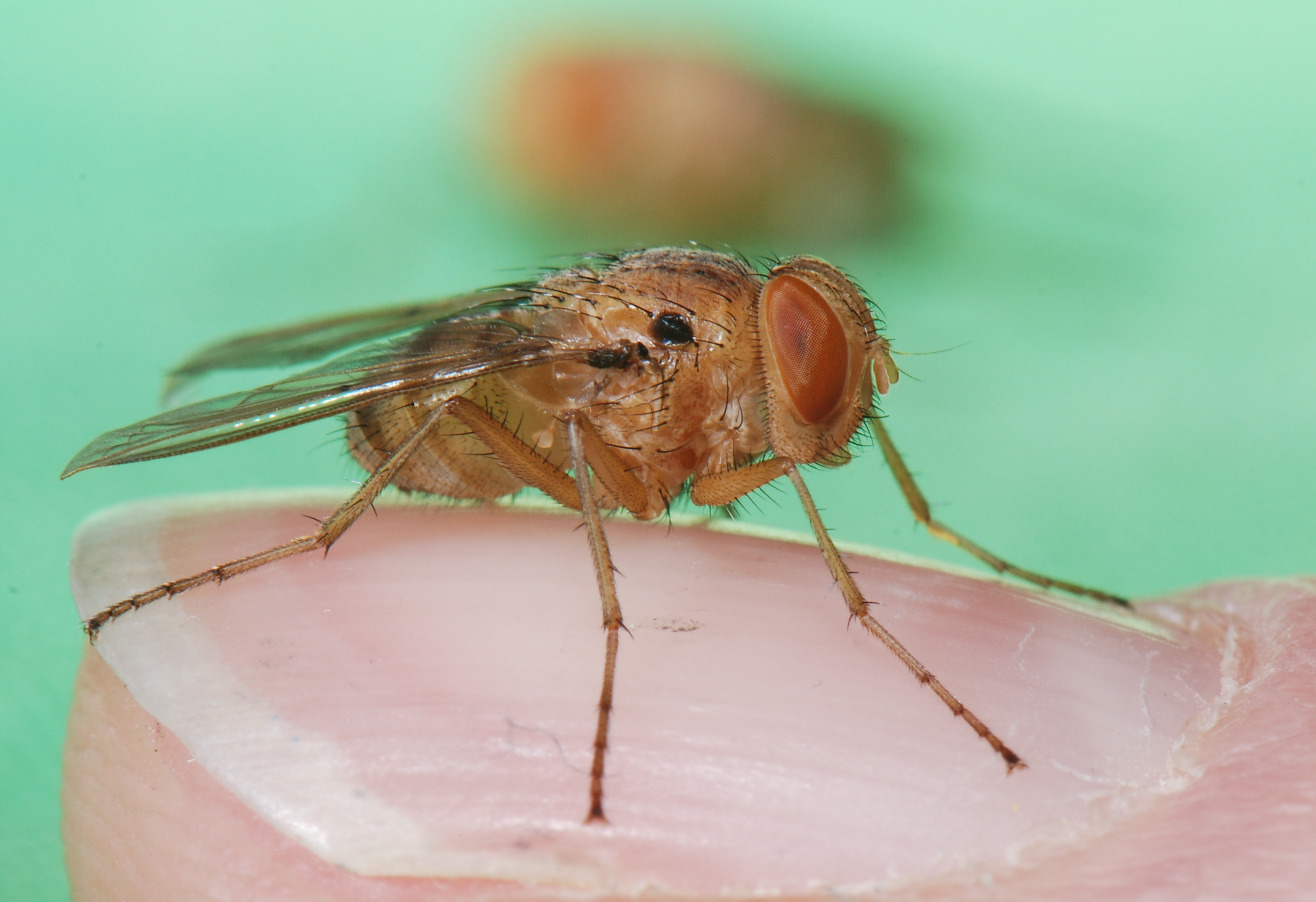
Ormia ochracea, notable for its acute directional hearing

In many species only one egg is laid on or in any individual host, and accordingly such an egg tends to be large, as is typical for eggs laid in small numbers. They are large enough to be clearly visible if stuck onto the outside of the host, and they generally are so firmly stuck that eggs cannot be removed from the skin of the host without killing them. Furthermore, scientists have observed in studies with the host cabbage looper that being glued to the host insect helps maggots burrow into the larva, where they remain until fully developed.

Yet another strategy of oviposition among some Tachinidae is to lay large numbers of small, darkly coloured eggs on the food plants of the host species. Sturmia, Zenillia, and Gonia are such genera.

Many tachinids are important natural enemies of major insect pests, and some species actually are used in biological pest control; for example, some species of tachinid flies have been introduced into North America from their native lands as biocontrols to suppress populations of alien pests. Conversely, certain tachinid flies that prey on useful insects are themselves considered as pests; they can present troublesome problems in the sericulture industry by attacking silkworm larvae. One particularly notorious silkworm pest is the Uzi fly (Exorista bombycis).

Another reproductive strategy is to leave the eggs in the host's environment; for example, the female might lay on leaves, where the host is likely to ingest them. Some tachinids that are parasitoids of stem-boring caterpillars deposit eggs outside the host's burrow, letting the first instar larvae do the work of finding the host for themselves. In other species, the maggots use an ambush technique, waiting for the host to pass and then attacking it and burrowing into its body.

Adult tachinids are not parasitic, but either do not feed at all or visit flowers, decaying matter, or similar sources of energy to sustain themselves until they have concluded their procreative activities. Their non-parasitic behaviour after eclosion from the pupa is what justifies the application of the term "protelean".

== Description ==
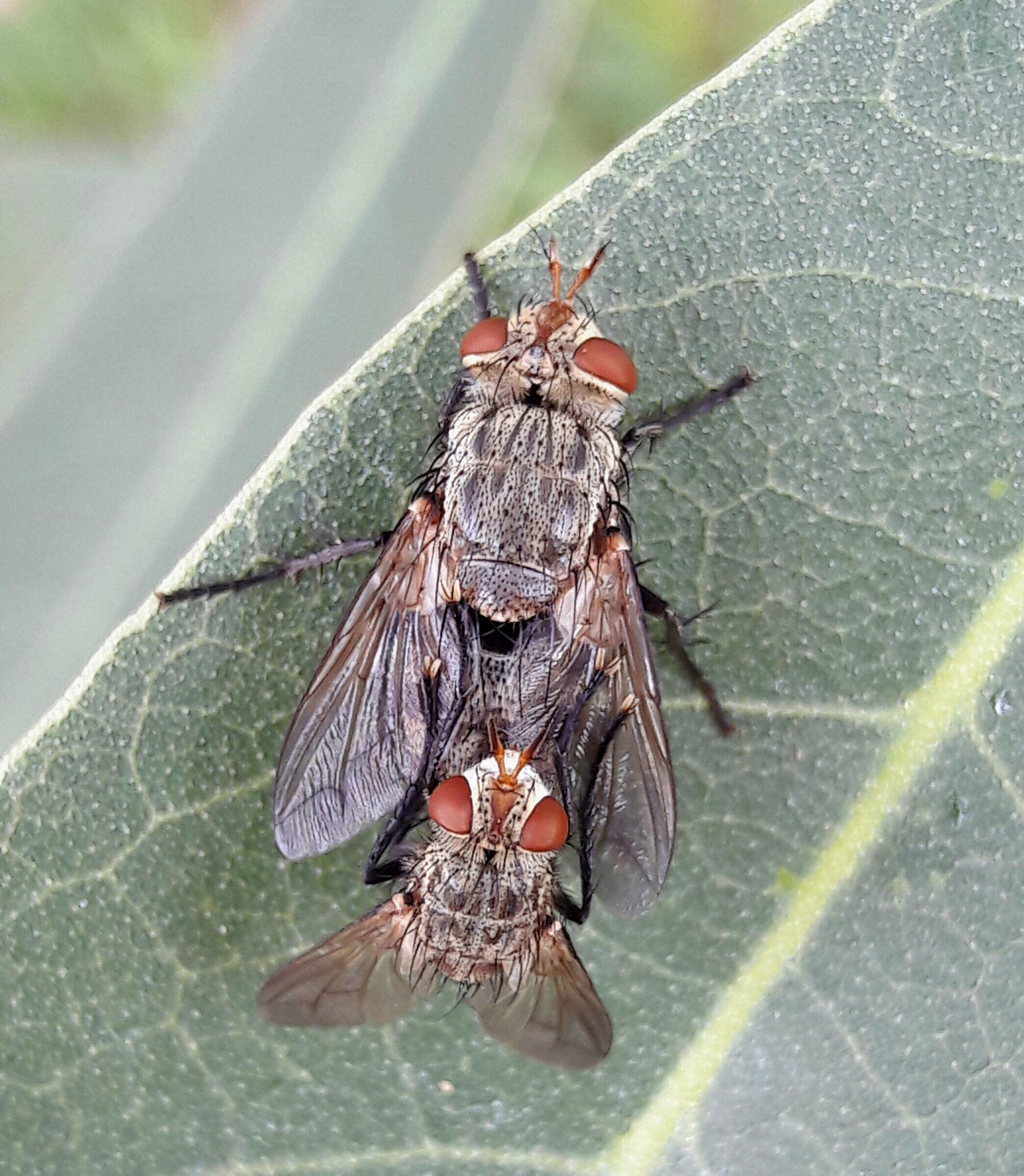
Tachinid flies mating

Tachinid flies are extremely varied in appearance. Some adult flies may be brilliantly colored and resemble blow-flies (family Calliphoridae). Most however are rather drab, some resembling house flies. However, tachinid flies commonly are more bristly and more robust. Also, they usually have a characteristic appearance. They have three-segmented antennae, a diagnostically prominent postscutellum bulging beneath the scutellum (a segment of the mesonotum). They are aristate flies, and the arista usually is bare, though sometimes plumose. The calypters (small flaps above the halteres) are usually very large. Their fourth long vein bends away sharply.

The taxonomy of this family presents many difficulties. It is largely based on morphological characters of the adult flies, but also on reproductive habits and on the immature stage.

== Diet of adult flies and pollination ==
Worldwide, many Diptera families act as significant pollinators, ranging from generalist nectar and pollen feeders to specialised long-tongued species adapted for floral nectar consumption. Their effectiveness as pollinators is enhanced by their frequent flower visitation and ability to carry large pollen loads.

Adult Tachinids visit flowers primarily to obtain nectar for energy and pollen for essential nutrients such as proteins, lipids, and vitamins, which enhance longevity and fecundity. Though they are predominantly generalist flower visitors, tachinids can be important pollinators, especially in high-elevation ecosystems (>2000 m) where bees are relatively few. However, specialised pollination by tachinids is uncommon, with only a few plant taxa, such as certain orchids, having evolved such interactions.

Tachinid adults exhibit two main feeding strategies based on proboscis length. Most species are "short-tongued," feeding on exposed nectaries, easily accessible nectar and hemipteran honeydew, while less common "long-tongued" species possess elongated mouthparts specialised for accessing deeper floral nectaries. Despite these morphological differences, many species display flexible foraging behaviour, visiting both flowers and extrafloral nectar sources. Prosena siberita (Dexiinae) is a tachinid fly notable for its exceptionally long proboscis, approximately half the length of its body. Although they possess elongated mouthparts, the species functions as a generalist flower visitor, feeding on nectar from a range of floral species. However, it does not appear to act as an effective pollinator, as there are no observations of pollen attaching to its body or evidence of pollen-feeding behaviour. There are only a small number of tachinids with proboscises longer than the head, and majority of these are representatives of the subfamilies Tachiniae and Dexiinae. The evolution of a long proboscis signifies an adaptation to being able to reach nectar at the base of a deep flower tube or long nectar spur.

Members of the subfamilies Phasiinae and Tachininae are frequent flower visitors and have been recorded pollinating a variety of plants. Some orchids have evolved highly specific relationships with tachinid flies, for instance, Trichoceros species employ sexual deception by mimicking female tachinids to lure males that inadvertently transfer pollinia during pseudocopulation. Similarly, Neotinea ustulata varieties are pollinated by Tachina fera, T. magnicornis, and Nowickia ferox, which have proven more effective at pollinaria transfer than bees visiting the same flowers. In Telipogon orchids (e.g. T. peruvianus), pollination also occurs via sexual deception. The flowers emit volatile compounds mimicking female Eudejeania and Peleteria tachinids, attracting males that attempt copulation and inadvertently transfer pollinia. Although several tachinid males are drawn to these orchids, only Eudejeania aff. browni effectively acts as the pollinator.

=== New Zealand Tachinidae Diet/Pollination ===
In New Zealand, pollination systems are largely generalised and entomophilous, with many flowers adapted to visits from a wide range of insects, including flies. Among Diptera, the Tachinidae are the most abundant flower visitors to montane and alpine plants. They visit diverse plant species, with genera such as Pales, Avibrissina, Heteria, Proscissio, Zealandotachina, and Protohystricia commonly recorded. At higher elevations, species like Veluta albicincta and Avibrissina isolata become key pollinators due to their dense body hairs and strong flight ability, which enhance pollen transfer even under cold or wet conditions.

New Zealand tachinids are generalist foragers, showing no evidence of exclusive associations with specific plant taxa, though some species exhibit preferences for particular flower types. The long-tongued Protohystricia huttoni frequently visits Myosotis colensoi, whose long corolla tubes may limit nectar access to other species, suggesting a degree of morphological matching between fly and flower.

== As biological pest control ==
Some tachinid flies parasitize pest species. This has allowed them to be used as biological control agents by farmers. Some Tachinidae are generalists; for instance, Compsilura concinnata uses at least 200 different hosts, and thus is less safe to be used as biological controls because they will attack non-pest species, resulting in population decline. Others are more specialized and are safer; for instance, Istocheta aldrichi, which only attacks the Japanese beetle.

== Evolution ==
This clade appears to have originated in the middle Eocene. The oldest known putatively tachinid fossil (Lithexorista) dates from the Eocene Green River Formation in Wyoming.

== See also ==
- List of Tachinidae genera
- Parasitoid wasp
