= Cockchafer (disambiguation) =

Cockchafer is a common name for several species of plant eating scarab beetles regarded as agricultural pests. It is most commonly used for several European species of the genus Melolontha:

- The common cockchafer (Melolontha melolontha)
- The forest cockchafer (Melolontha hippocastani)

Other species referred to as cockchafers include:

- Holotrichia parallela (referred to as the "Asian cockchafer")
- Red-headed cockchafer (Adoryphorus couloni) native to Australia

== See also ==
- Cockchafer soup
- HMS Cockchafer
