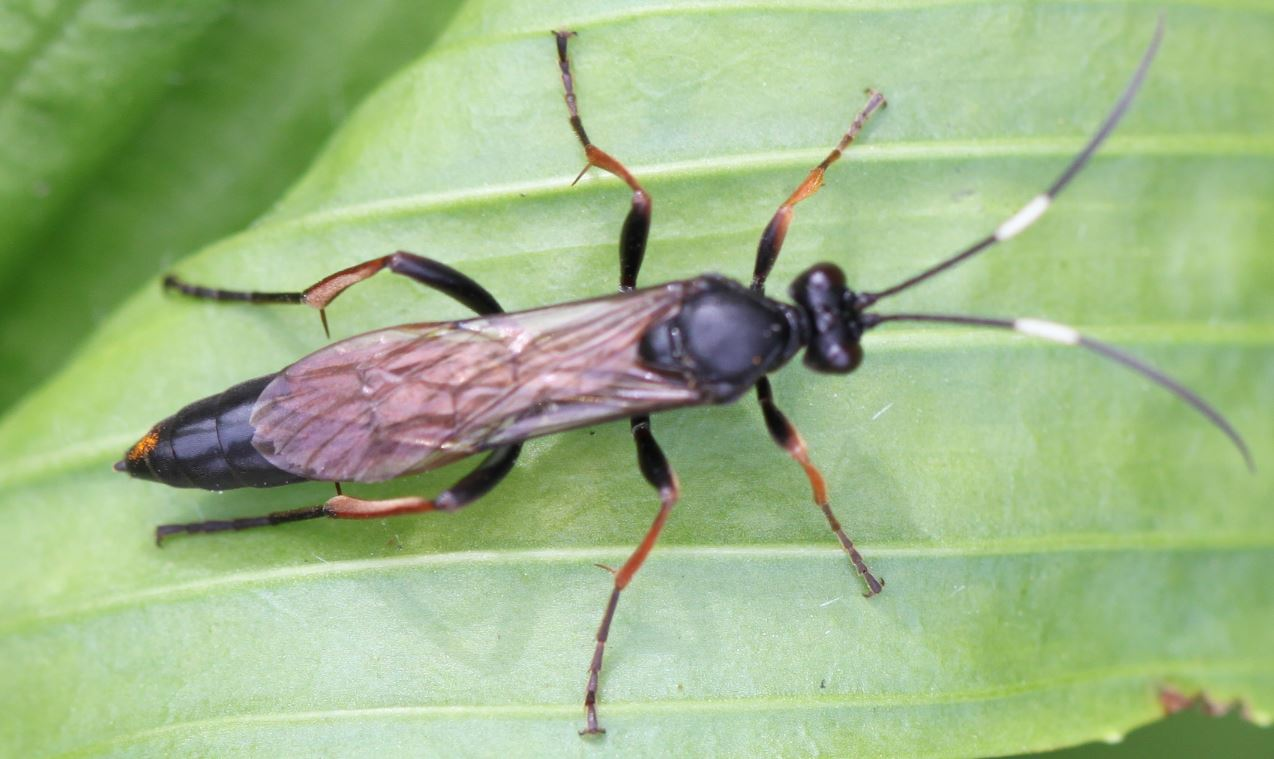

Scientific classification
- Kingdom: Animalia
- Phylum: Arthropoda
- Class: Insecta
- Order: Hymenoptera
- Family: Ichneumonidae
- Genus: Stenichneumon
- Species: S. culpator

Binomial name
- Stenichneumon culpator (Schrank, 1802)

= Stenichneumon culpator =

Species of wasp

Stenichneumon culpator is a species of ichneumon wasp in the family Ichneumonidae. Solitary individuals are known to hibernate within tunnels made by beetles beneath bark.

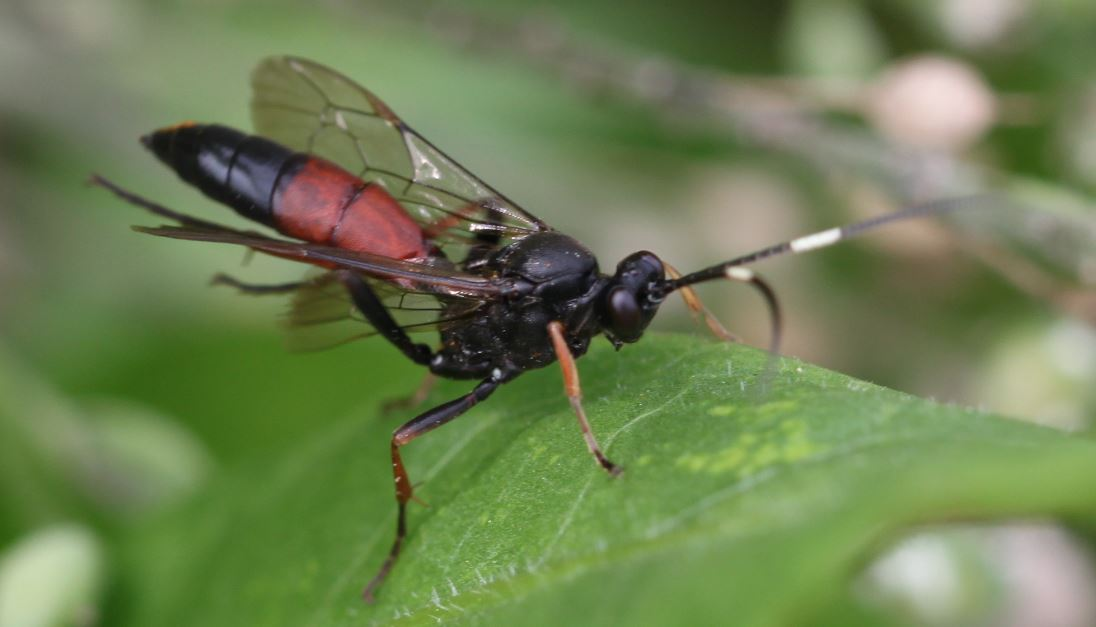

== Subspecies ==
These three subspecies belong to the species Stenichneumon culpator:

- Stenichneumon culpator adsentator (Tischbein, 1881)^{c g}
- Stenichneumon culpator cincticornis (Cresson, 1864)^{b}
- Stenichneumon culpator culpator^{g}

Data sources: i = ITIS, c = Catalogue of Life, g = GBIF, b = Bugguide.net
