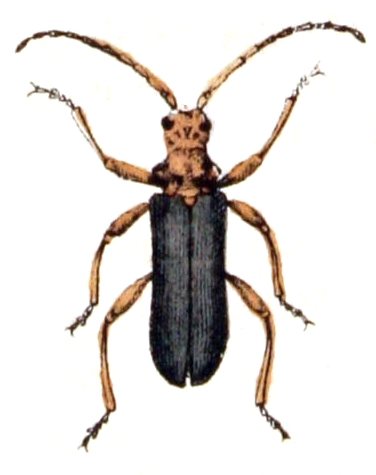
- Rhamnusium salicis

Scientific classification
- Kingdom: Animalia
- Phylum: Arthropoda
- Class: Insecta
- Order: Coleoptera
- Suborder: Polyphaga
- Infraorder: Cucujiformia
- Family: Cerambycidae
- Subfamily: Lepturinae
- Genus: Rhamnusium; Latreille, 1829

= Rhamnusium =

Genus of beetles

Rhamnusium is a genus of beetles belonging to the family Cerambycidae and tribe Rhamnusiini.

The species of this genus are found in Europe.

Species:

- Rhamnusium algericum Pic (1896)
- Rhamnusium bicolor Schrank (1781)
