= Heuberg Castle =

Building in Salzburg, Austria

- Schloss Heuberg
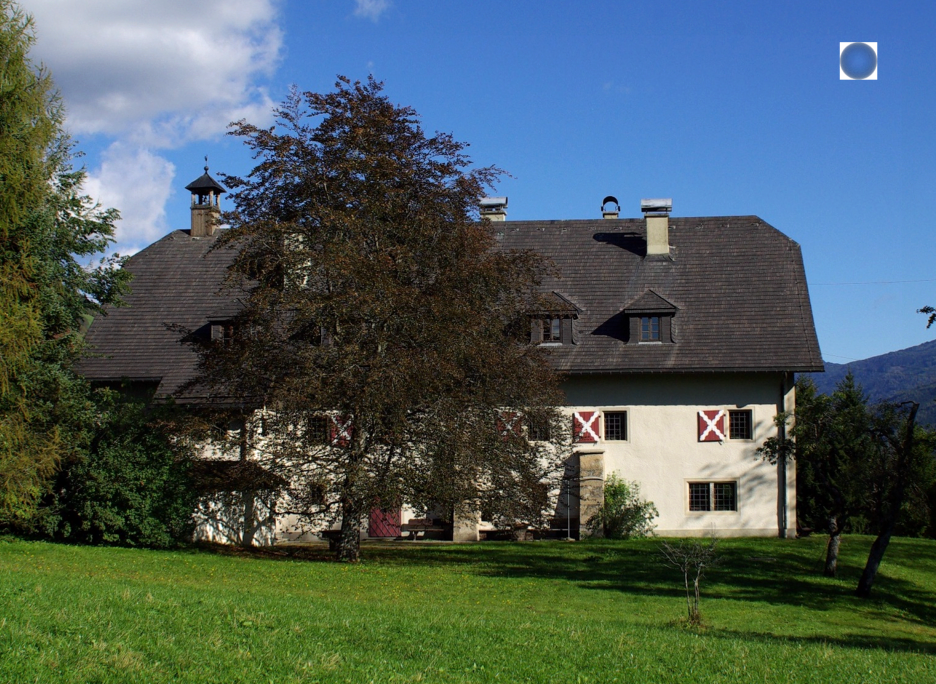
- Heuberg Castle

Site information
- Owner: Porsche–Piëch family
- Condition: rubuild

Location
- Coordinates: 47°17′29″N 12°52′35″E

Site history
- Built by: Unknown

The Heuberg Castle is located on the Salzach River in the hamlet of St. Georgen in the municipality of Bruck an der Großglocknerstraße in Salzburg, Austria.

== History ==
The castle was built c. 1100 by Irmgard von Sulzbach and was then known as the "court at Niederheim". The estate was given to the Berengar II of Sulzbach by the ruler of the Berchtesgaden Provostry, and it became the official seat of the Niederheim Provostry. In 1296, for the first time in a document, the estate was no longer referred to as the "court at Niederheim" but as "Schloss Heuberg" (Heuberg Castle). In a 1454 document the castle is described as the "court of Herlikait on Heuperg". In 1669 a fire destroyed the castle, and in 1673 it was rebuilt in a somewhat simplified form. In 1803 the Abbey of Berchtesgaden lost its property to the Bavarian state, which sold the castle to Karl von Moll in the same year. His descendants sold the estate to the Pinzgau family in 1849 and in 1900 there was another big fire which led to the castle being renovated once again. After a fire in 1900, it received its current simplified form. The castle was sold to the Porsche family in 1970.

== Building description ==
The castle is two stories high, 28 metres (92 ft) long and 17 metres (56 ft) wide.
