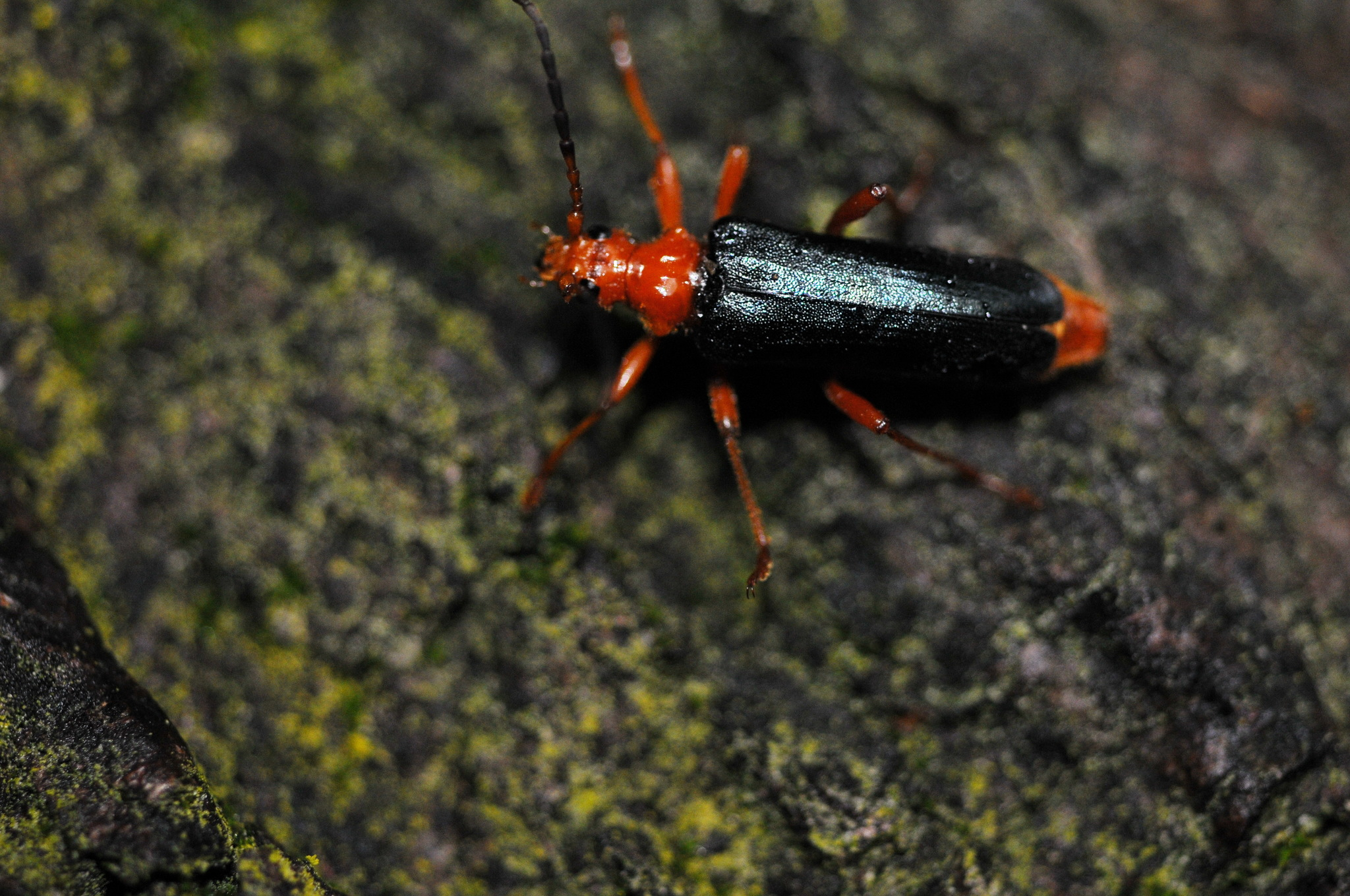

Scientific classification
- Kingdom: Animalia
- Phylum: Arthropoda
- Clade: Pancrustacea
- Class: Insecta
- Order: Coleoptera
- Suborder: Polyphaga
- Infraorder: Cucujiformia
- Family: Cerambycidae
- Genus: Rhamnusium
- Species: R. bicolor

Binomial name
- Rhamnusium bicolor Schrank. (1781)

= Rhamnusium bicolor =

Species of beetle

Rhamnusium bicolor is a species of beetle in the family Cerambycidae. The species is widespread in Europe. It was first described by German biologist Franz von Paula Schrank (1747–1835) in 1781.

The adult beetle is 12–24 mm (0.47–0.94 in) in size and flies between May and June. The development cycle is 2-3 years.

There are eight accepted subspecies:

- Rhamnusium bicolor constans Danilevsky, 2012
- Rhamnusium bicolor demaggii Tippmann, 1956
- Rhamnusium bicolor graecum Schaufuß, 1862
- Rhamnusium bicolor italicum Müller, 1966
- Rhamnusium bicolor juglandis Fairmaire, 1866
- Rhamnusium bicolor lenkoranum Danilevsky, 2012
- Rhamnusium bicolor praeustum Reitter, 1895
- Rhamnusium bicolor testaceipenne Pic, 1897

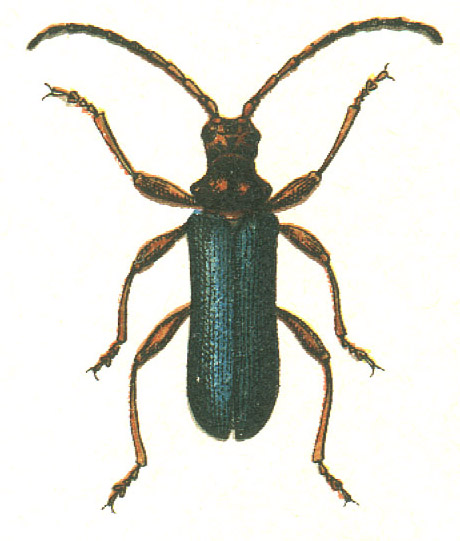
