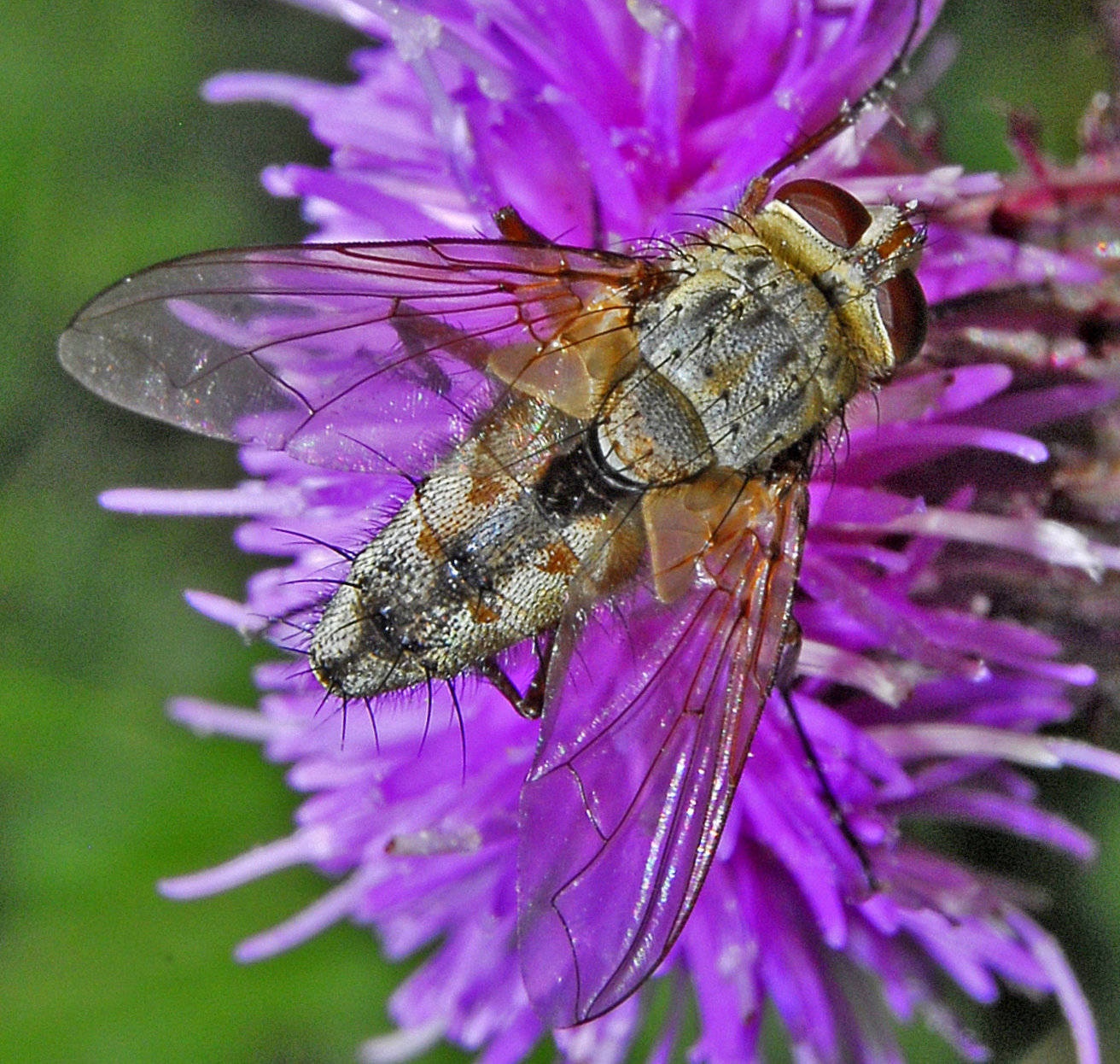
- Dexia rustica. Dorsal view

Scientific classification
- Kingdom: Animalia
- Phylum: Arthropoda
- Class: Insecta
- Order: Diptera
- Family: Tachinidae
- Subfamily: Dexiinae
- Tribe: Dexiini
- Genus: Dexia
- Species: D. rustica

Binomial name
- Dexia rustica (Fabricius, 1775)

Synonyms
- Dexia flavicornis Meigen, 1826; Dexia grisea Robineau-Desvoidy, 1830; Dexia testacea Macquart, 1834; Dinera fulvipes Robineau-Desvoidy, 1830; Ida petiolata Robineau-Desvoidy, 1863; Musca germanica Gmelin, 1790; Musca longipes Stephens, 1829; Musca plebeja Fabricius, 1781; Musca provenio Harris, 1780; Musca rustica Fabricius, 1775

= Dexia rustica =

Species of fly

Dexia rustica is a species of fly in the family Tachinidae.

== Distribution and habitat ==
British Isles, Czech Republic, Hungary, Latvia, Moldova, Poland, Romania, Slovakia, Ukraine, Denmark, Finland, Sweden, Albania, Bosnia and Herzegovina, Bulgaria, Croatia, Greece, Italy, Portugal, Serbia, Slovenia, Spain, Turkey, Austria, Belgium, France, Germany, Netherlands, Switzerland, Iran, Israel, Mongolia, Russia, Transcaucasia.

These tachinids usually inhabit hedge rows and flowery environments.

== Description ==
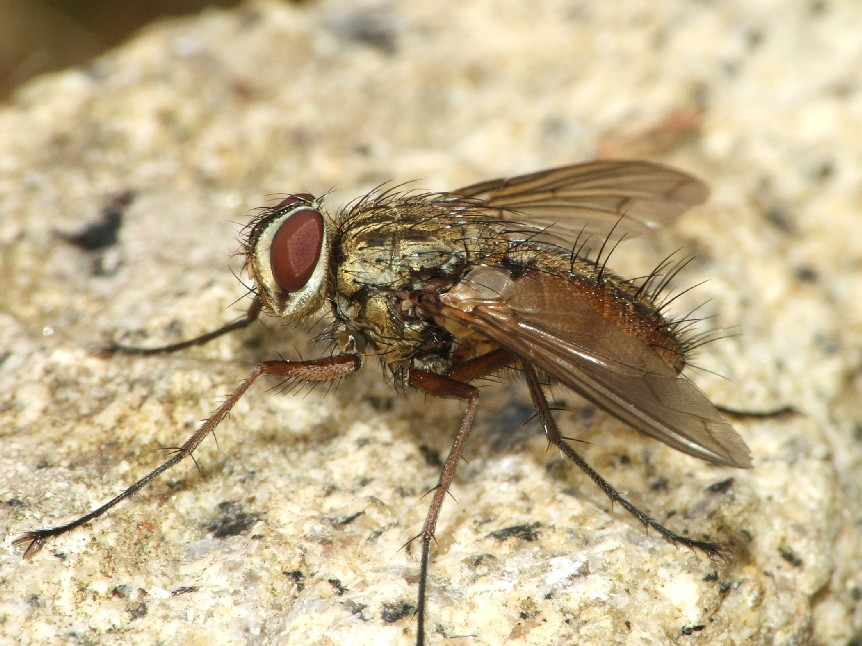
Side view

Dexia rustica can reach a body length of 8.4–12.7 millimetres (0.33–0.50 in) and a wingspan of 16–24 mm. These small tachinids have generally a black thorax, with grayish yellow pruinosity. Four longitudinal black vittae appear on dorsum, Abdomen appears greyish-brown or reddish, with a darker longitudinal dorsal marking, more or less evident. It is cylindric-conic, with two setae among each segment. Probocis is short and membranous. Females usually are darker than males. Wings are hyaline, with a reddish yellow tegula and a dark brown basicosta. Legs are reddish yellow.

== Biology ==
Adults can be found from June to August, feeding on nectar and pollen, especially of Heracleum sphondylium.

Larvae develop in the soil feeding on beetle larvae (endoparasitism), mainly of Melolontha melolontha, Amphimallon solstitialis, Rhizotrogus marginipes and Phyllopertha horticola (Scarabaeidae).
