= Schlaf, Kindlein, schlaf =

German lullaby

"Schlaf, Kindlein, schlaf" ("Sleep, dear child, sleep") is a German lullaby.

The oldest surviving version is a text and melody fragment of the first stanza, which appears in 1611 as part of a quodlibet in Melchior Franck's Fasciculus quodlibeticus. The current melody of the lullaby was composed by Johann Friedrich Reichardt in 1781 after a folk tune and also used for "Maikäfer flieg" (cockchafer fly). The currently known text version was distributed by the third volume of the collection Des Knaben Wunderhorn (1808). As a template for the first stanza was a Low German version of Johann Friedrich Schütze's Holsteinisches Idiotikon (1806), the other stanzas are added poetry of Clemens Brentano. Franz Magnus Böhme reprinted 36 text variants in 1897.

Johannes Brahms set the text to his own music as No. 11 in his collection 15 Volkskinderlieder, WoO 31 (1857).

== Melody ==
The melody by Johann Friedrich Reichardt is from 1781.

== Text ==
Schlaf, Kindlein, schlaf,
Der Vater hüt die Schaf,
Die Mutter schüttelts Bäumelein,
Da fällt herab ein Träumelein,
Schlaf, Kindlein, schlaf.

Schlaf, Kindlein, schlaf,
Am Himmel ziehn die Schaf,
Die Sternlein sind die Lämmerlein,
Der Mond der ist das Schäferlein,
Schlaf, Kindlein, schlaf.

Schlaf, Kindlein, schlaf,
Christkindlein hat ein Schaf,
Ist selbst das liebe Gotteslamm,
Das um uns all zu Tode kam,
Schlaf, Kindlein, schlaf!

Schlaf, Kindlein, schlaf,
So schenk ich dir ein Schaf
Mit einer goldnen Schelle fein,
Das soll dein Spielgeselle sein,
Schlaf, Kindlein, schlaf!

Schlaf, Kindlein, schlaf,
Und blöck nicht wie ein Schaf,
Sonst kömmt des Schäfers Hündelein,
Und beißt mein böses Kindelein,
Schlaf, Kindlein, schlaf.

Schlaf, Kindlein, schlaf,
Geh fort und hüt die Schaf,
Geh fort du schwarzes Hündelein,
Und weck mir nicht mein Kindelein,
Schlaf, Kindlein, schlaf.

Sleep, little child, sleep
The father tends the sheep,
The mother shakes the little tree,
At that, a little dream falls here
Sleep, little child, sleep

Sleep, little child, sleep
In Heaven drift the sheep
The little stars are little lambs
The moon, he is the little shepherd
Sleep, little child, sleep

Sleep, little child, sleep
The Christ Child has a sheep,
He is himself the dear Lamb of God
Who died for the sake of all of us
Sleep, little child, sleep

Sleep, little child, sleep
Then I'll give you a lamb
With a fine golden bell
Who shall be your playmate
Sleep, little child, sleep

Sleep, little child, sleep
And don't bleat like a sheep
Or else might come the shepherd's dog
and bite my naughty little child
Sleep, little child, sleep

Sleep, little child, sleep
Go forth and tend the sheep
Go forth, you little black dog
and wake no more my little child
Sleep, little child, sleep

Additional Verses:
Sleep, my child, sleep
out there walks a sheep
but now its time for beddy-byes
so come on, my child close your eyes
Sleep, my child, sleep.
