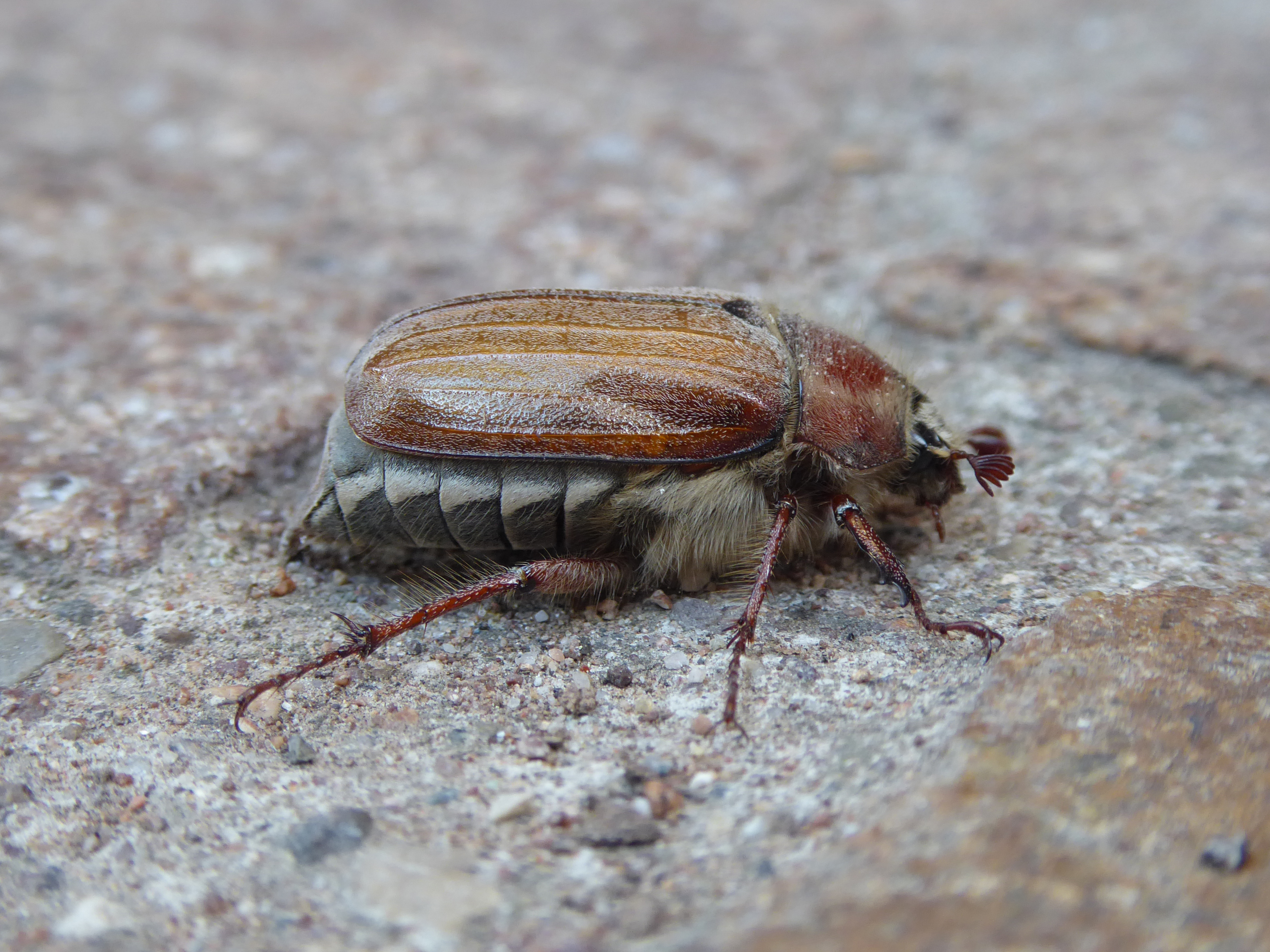

Scientific classification
- Kingdom: Animalia
- Phylum: Arthropoda
- Clade: Pancrustacea
- Class: Insecta
- Order: Coleoptera
- Suborder: Polyphaga
- Infraorder: Scarabaeiformia
- Family: Scarabaeidae
- Tribe: Melolonthini
- Genus: Melolontha
- Species: M. hippocastani

Binomial name
- Melolontha hippocastani Fabricius, 1801

Synonyms
- Melolontha mongolica Ménétriés, 1854; Melolontha hippocastani sefcaki Fleischer, 1912; Melolontha melolontha mulsanti Bedel, 1911; Melolontha hippocastani picea Wanach, 1906; Melolontha hippocastani suturalis Kraatz, 1897; Melolontha hippocastani baicalica Reitter, 1892; Melolontha hippocastani schwarzi Kraatz, 1888; Melolontha hippocastani romana Reitter, 1887; Melolontha hippocastani fuscicollis Kraatz, 1885; Melolontha hippocastani aethiops Westhoff, 1884; Melolontha hippocastani amasicola Westhoff, 1884; Melolontha hippocastani festiva Westhoff, 1884; Melolontha hippocastani metzleri Westhoff, 1884; Melolontha hippocastani discoidalis Dalla Torre, 1879; Melolontha hippocastani rex Dalla Torre, 1879; Melolontha hippocastani albicaus Stierlin, 1863; Melolontha hippocastani coronata Mulsant, 1842; Melolontha hippocastani nigricollis Mulsant, 1842; Melolontha hippocastani tibialis Mulsant, 1842; Melolontha nigripes Comolli, 1837; Melolontha vulgaris Olivier, 1789

= Melolontha hippocastani =

Species of scarab

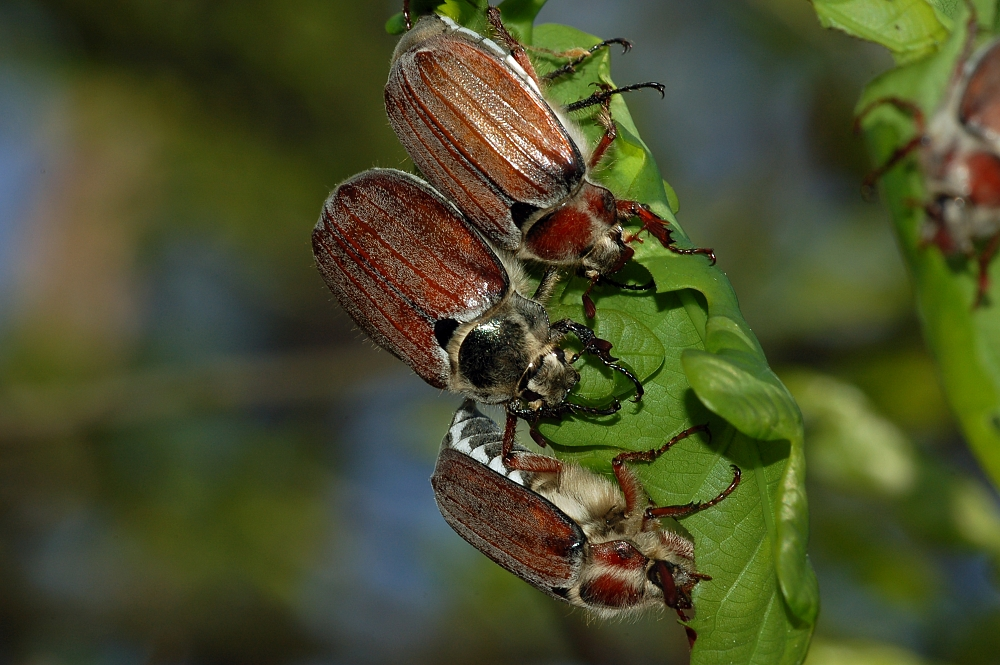
Melolontha hippocastani in Darmstadt, Germany

Melolontha hippocastani, the northern cockchafer, is a species of scarab beetle native to Eurasia, with its range spanning from Western Europe to the Pacific coast of China. It is one of several species in the genus Melolontha known as cockchafers, alongside the common cockchafer (Melolontha melolontha) and Melolontha pectoralis, but generally at more northern latitudes, or at higher altitudes in upland woods of further southern Europe. The adults are around 20–29 mm in length. It is distinguished from Melolontha melolontha by the shape of its pygidium, which is primarily black in colour, and red in M. melolontha. It primarily dwells in forests, and as such is also known as the forest cockchafer. The mate-finding behaviour in M. hippocastani is facilitated by plant volatiles and sex pheromones. Mating activities primarily takes place during the evening flight periods. Females lay their eggs in soil, and the larvae scavenges on decaying organic matter and later small plant roots, including the roots of young trees like pines and firs. The larvae usually develop between 3 and 5 years. They emerge between late April and the end of June. Like other cockchafers, they have been considered a serious pest of crops and trees particularly the oak tree.

== Description ==
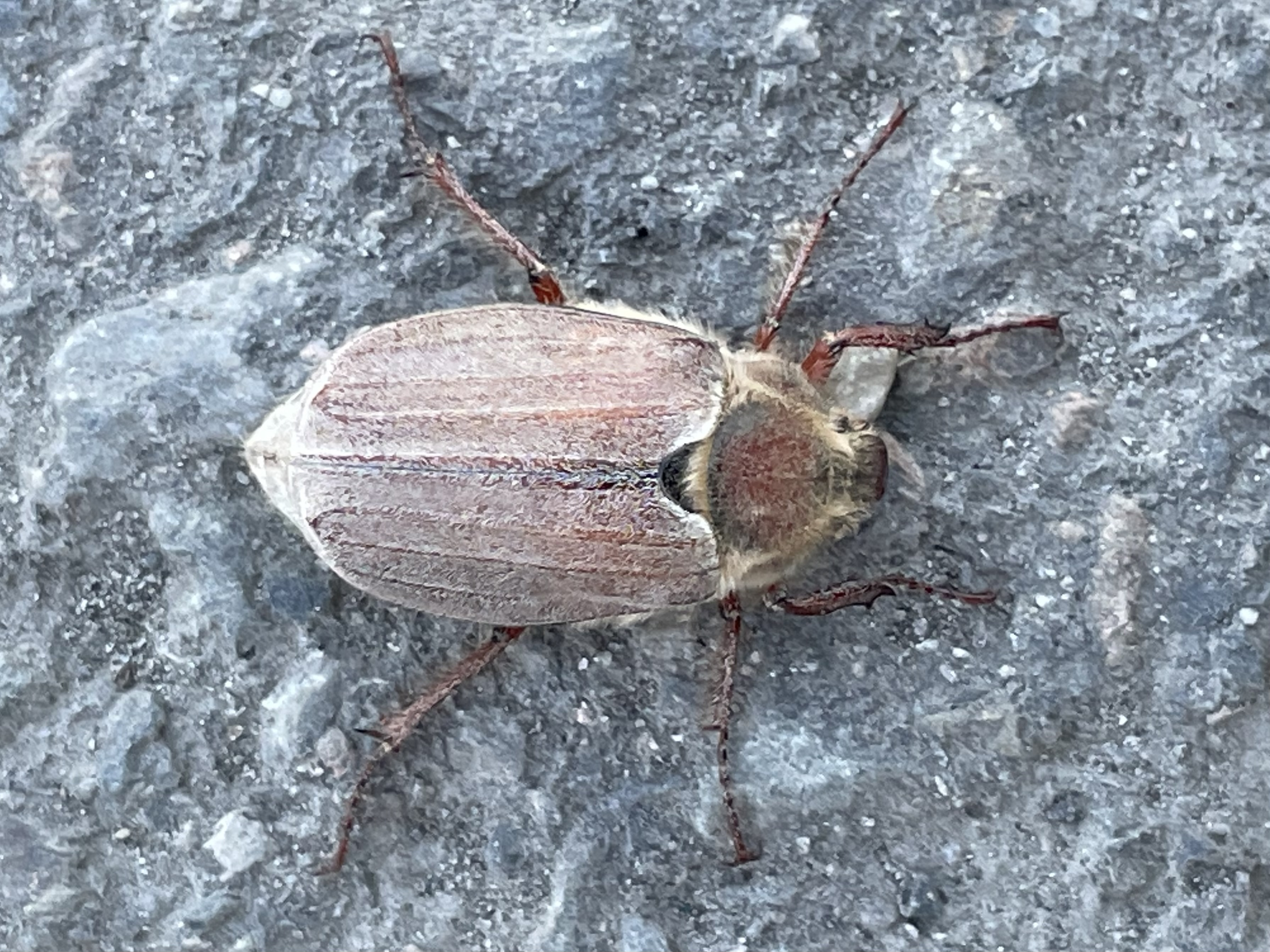
M. hippocastani wings and antennae are visible

In adult M. hippocastani, the physiology is designed in such a way that it helps in mate finding using sex pheromones. Melolonthinae sex pheromone glands are everted from the abdominal tip. M. hippocastani show sexual dimorphism within the antenna. Male antennae consist of seven large lamellae, while female clubs have only six smaller lamellae, which suggests different olfactory abilities between sexes and the presence of a female derived sex pheromone. Pheromone-degrading enzymes are present in the antennae of M. hippocastani and show considerable substrate specificity.

== Genetics ==
It has been found that M. hippocastani exhibits a high genetic diversity in local populations and a low genetic differentiation between populations across different areas. A research study in 2024 analysed microsatellite loci in 214 specimens of M. melolontha and 207 specimens of M. hippocastani and compared the genetic makeup between both the species. All of the cockchafer individuals were collected between 13 to 16 May 2015, from three primary outbreak areas in Poland which include Smardzewice, Ostrowiec Świętokrzyski and Lubaczów.

Results showed that for genetic distance, genetic differentiation was observed to be higher (fixation index $F_{ST}$ ranged from 0.009 to 0.033) in M. melolontha meanwhile the same was lower ($F_{ST}$ is 0.035) in M. hippocastani. For the bottleneck effect on species populations, M. melolontha had shown a higher probability for population collapse than M. hippocastani according to the Garza-Williamson index and BOTTLENECK software which uses these three genetic models—Infinite alleles model (IAM), Stepwise mutation model (SMM), and Two-stepwise mutation model (TMM). The higher number of bottlenecks in M. melolontha population as compared to M. hippocastani was shown to be due to pest control methods used in farmlands across Europe in 1950s and 1960s. Despite this, the current populations in both the species appears to have been stabilized because of a rising number of cockchafer outbreaks in recent years for e.g., 2007, 2011 and 2015 in Poland, thus overcoming the bottlenecks that caused drastic population reduction in the past.

The differences in genetic diversity across both M. melolontha and M. hippocastani thus shows that there has been a historical divergence between both the species.

== Subspecies ==
- Melolontha hippocastani hippocastani (Austria, Belarus, Belgium, Bosnia Herzegovina, Bulgaria, Croatia, Czech Republic, Denmark, Estonia, Finland, France, Germany, Great Britain, Hungary, Ireland, Italy, Kazakhstan, Latvia, Lithuania, Luxembourg, Moldova, Montenegro, Netherlands, Norway, Poland, Romania, Russia, Russia Far East, Serbia, Siberia, Slovakia, Slovenia, Spain, Sweden, Switzerland, Ukraine)
- Melolontha hippocastani mongolica Ménétriés, 1854 (China: Beijing, Gansu, Henan, Ningxia; Mongolia; Russian Far East, Siberia)

== Distribution and habitat ==
Melolontha hippocastani primarily resides in forest ecosystems in northern Eurasia. Its distribution range spans across most of Europe, excluding the northernmost and southernmost regions. This species extends its habitat into Mongolia, parts of Central Asia, and Siberia. Unlike its counterpart, the common cockchafer, which occupies diverse environments including forested and open areas, M. hippocastani is primarily a forest species, often in taiga forest.

== Life cycle ==
Once adult female M. hippocastani lay their eggs in the soil, the larvae spend 36 months underground feeding on plant roots. During this time, their growth phase is divided into three distinct phases. They pupate in summer in the first year, and in the second year, they grow to adults in winter. The third year, in late April to early May, the adult insects emerge from the soil and feed on tree foliage during which they engage in swarming. About 2 weeks after emergence, oviposition flights are observed. Females land on the ground at dusk and burrow into the soil to lay eggs in clusters. The females prefer sandy soils because they facilitate the females' digging, allow for larval movement, and allow volatile compounds from host to spread, facilitating the larval orientation and survival in the soil. Females lay an average of 24 eggs during their first egg-laying phase and 15 during their second egg-laying phase.

== Behaviour and ecology ==
=== Mate searching ===
Mating behaviour primarily occurs during flight periods at dusk, during which beetles hover around tree tops. During this time, females and males mate several times, and mating lasts for several hours. Then the females oviposit in the soil, which causes severe tree damage from them feeding on the tree roots. The swarming flights are mainly performed by males, while females stay in their host trees and continue feeding. Males are subsequently drawn towards damage-induced green leaf volatiles allowing location of mechanically damaged foliage, which allows males to locate females based on the leaves they have eaten. In order to distinguish between nonspecific leaf damage and damage caused by feeding females, male cockchafers orientate by a sex attractant which is released by the adult females. Research has investigated the role of sex pheromones of the scarab beetle on mating behaviour.

=== Volatiles and pheromones ===
Although both male and female beetles showed a physiological response to these volatiles, only males exhibited behavioural responses, suggesting that the volatile response reflects a mate-finding strategy rather than a search for feeding resources.

A variety of compounds have been analysed in research to identify which compound serves as a sex pheromone in M. hippocastani, and the mechanism by which it takes action. One research study determined that mate-finding behaviour in M. hippocastani is driven by males locating females using olfactory cues such as green leaf volatiles and 1,4-benzoquinone, along with the species' sexual dimorphism, which is the physiological difference between both the male and female cockchafer. Both males and females contain 1,4-benzoquinone; however it has been shown that female extracts provoked a higher number of landings than male extracts. This finding led to a further analysis on the quantities of 1,4-benzoquinone in each sex, which were found to be higher in females, suggesting its role in attracting males. This compound, known for its defensive function in arthropods, is hypothesised to have evolved into a sex pheromone in M. hippocastani. Thus, research on M. hippocastani show a dual function of 1,4-benzoquinone as both, a mate attractant and as a defense compound. Further research is exploring other compounds' roles to develop semiochemical-based methods for controlling M. hippocastani populations.

=== The role of (Z)-3-hexen-1-ol ===
Additional research investigated whether volatiles from freshly damaged leaves are more attractive to males than those from older damaged leaves. Analysis of volatiles from freshly damaged leaves revealed typical leaf aldehydes namely hexanal, (Z)-3-hexanal, (Z)-2-hexenal, (E)-2-hexenal, (Z)-3-hexen-1-ol and (Z)-3-hexenyl acetate while the older damaged leaves predominantly had (Z)-3-hexen-1-ol and (Z)-3-hexenyl acetate only. Surprisingly, males were equally attracted to volatiles from both fresh and old damaged leaves, with a preference for the latter in synthetic mixture experiments. Further experiments identified (Z)-3-hexen-1-ol as highly attractive to male beetles, while other tested compounds were behaviourally inactive. However, all tested compounds elicited comparable electrophysiological responses on male antennae. Thus, (Z)-3-hexen-1-ol plays a vital role in the sexual communication of M. hippocastani, attracting both sexes of an insect.

=== Intestinal components and microbiome ===
Digestion in M. hippocastani is facilitated by microbial symbionts residing in its guts. M. hippocastani larvae guts consist of two large compartments—a tubular midgut and an enlarged hindgut. The midgut releases hydrolytic enzymes into an alkaline and oxidative environment, which threaten the development of bacteria within the cockchafer. The hindgut is an expanded organ specialised for anaerobic fermentation. Both regions have diverse bacterial communities, which are responsible for gut pH modification, the detoxification of plant allelochemicals and the maintenance of the microbial community structure.

The gut microbes for e.g., S. liquefaciens, P. fluorescens and C. freundii play a crucial role in breaking down woody food components in M. hippocastani such as lignocelluloses (cellulose, pectin and starch) and xylans. When comparing the larvae and adult microbiotes of M. hippocastani, the larvae microbiotes had harsher conditions, yet harboured a richer and more diverse bacterial community compared to the diapausing adult guts. A core group of bacterial phylotypes was shared between larvae and adults for e.g., Clostridiaceae, Desulfovibrionaceae, Enterobacteriaceae, thus indicating some degree of stability in M. hippocastani despite different feeding habits. Little overlap was observed between bacterial species from food or soil contamination and those in the gut, suggesting minimal alteration of bacterial diversity upon ingestion. Some microbe isolates from larvae displayed amylase and xylanolytic properties related to digestion. This symbiotic relationship underscores the importance of microbes in the digestive processes in cockchafers.

A high manganese (Mn) content in the diet of M. hippocastani shows a significant effect on their activity and fertility. As the Mn content in their food increased, the activity of adult cockchafers decreased, and the adult females showed zero fertility. Despite the cockchafers' ability for self-detoxification, the presence of Mn in their diet still influenced their activity. Also expelling Mn through the digestive system serves as the primary mechanism for the cockchafers' self-detoxification process, showing the relationship between diet, digestion, and physiological responses in M. hippocastani.

== As a forest pest ==
The parasitic nature of M. hippocastani has caused damage to a wide variety of forest tree foliages, which has led to research for strategies to understand the species, and to mitigate their harmful impacts, which will protect the forests that inhabit these beetles. For e.g., in parts of southern Germany, specifically in the states of Hessen, Rheinland-Pfalz, and Baden-Württemberg, mass breeding of M. hippocastani has been observed every 3–4 years, which causes damage from adults feeding on the foliage between April and May. However, this damage can be compensated during a secondary sprouting period in June. Contrarily, grubs that develop within 3–4 years in the forest soil are rhizophagous as they cause severe, long-term damage on seedlings and young trees by feeding on roots. In northeastern France, specifically in the Vosges Mountains, M. hippocastani populations have been at epidemic levels since 2007, and high larval densities have been recorded, which induces a high mortality risk for forest plantations. Thus, M. hippocastani can cause vast economic and ecological losses in oak-dominated forest as oak trees are a good food source for cockchafers.

=== Pest management ===
Extensive research continues to be performed on management of these pests. Specifically, research has shown that forests with a dense shrub layer have a negative effect on the density of egg clusters and the number of eggs in the soil, while forests with a canopy openness and the proportion of oak basal area have positive effects. Some theories for the destructive impacts of dense shrubbery on the ability of M. hippocastani to lay eggs in the soil include: higher ground with shrubby vegetation increases moisture that allows the growth of Entomopathogenic fungi like B. brongniartii on it, the shrub acting as an impenetrable barrier, flight imprecision of the beetle, and the use of olfaction to sense the environment as methods with which the shrubbery could impact the egg laying behaviour of the adult females. These techniques thus have a potential to understand egg laying patterns to mitigate forest damage.
