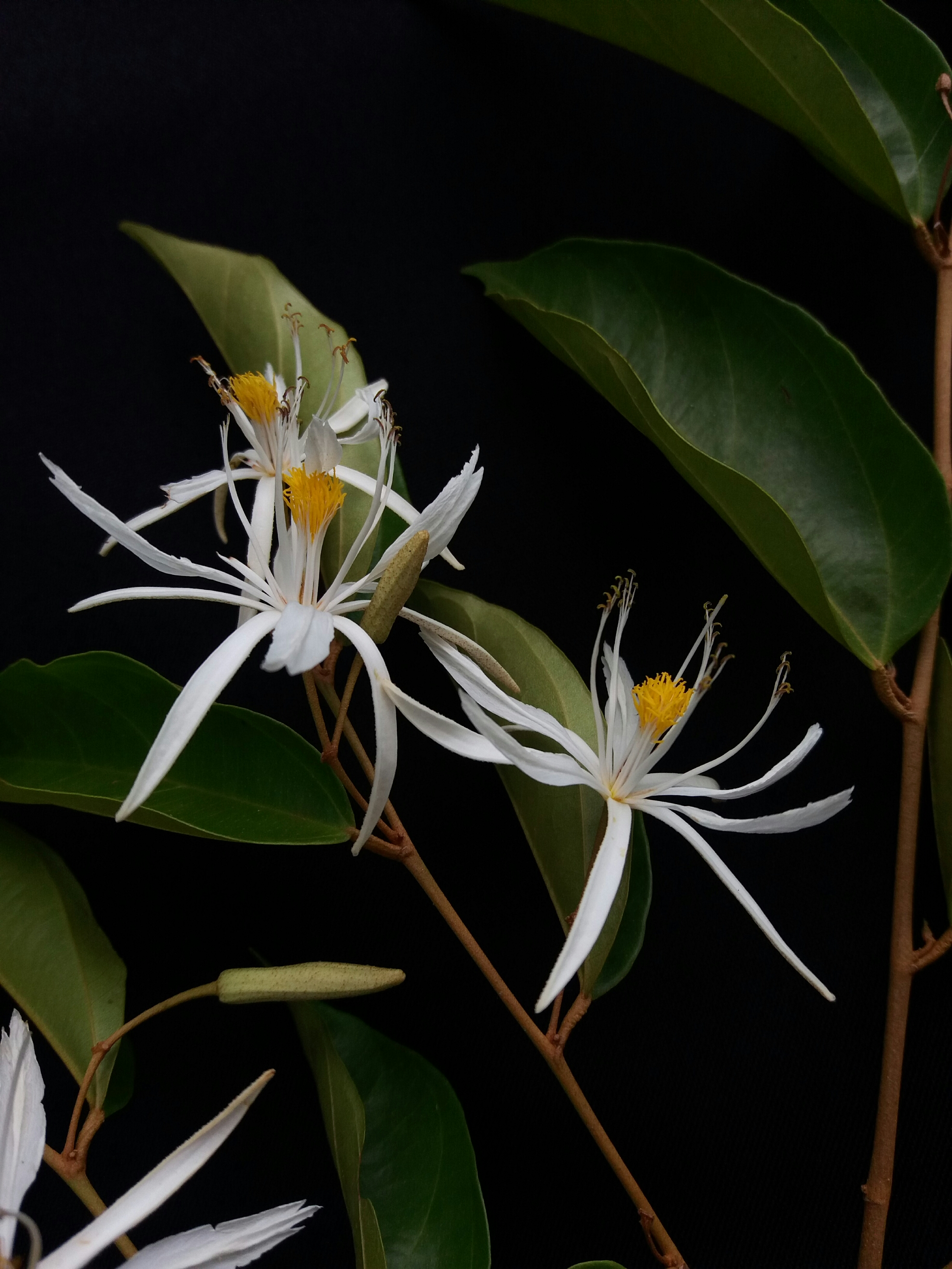
- Mollia lepidota

Scientific classification
- Kingdom: Plantae
- Clade: Tracheophytes
- Clade: Angiosperms
- Clade: Eudicots
- Clade: Rosids
- Order: Malvales
- Family: Malvaceae
- Subfamily: Grewioideae
- Genus: Mollia; Mart.

Type species
- Mollia speciosa Mart.

Synonyms
- Schlechtendalia Spreng.

= Mollia (plant) =

Genus of flowering plants

Mollia is a genus of flowering plants belonging to the family Malvaceae. It is within the Grewioideae subfamily, and the Grewieae tribe.

== Description ==
Mollia are large trees, or tall shrubs, growing up to 15 metres (49 ft) tall.

They have 3-veined from the base leaves which have serrated, toothed (dentate) or smooth margins. The indumentum (surface covering) has stellate hairs and pelate scales. They have rudimentary (or small) stipules (a small appendage at the bases of leaves), which are caducous (fall off early).

It has inflorescences in few- to many flowered units, sometimes on a common peduncle (stalk), or solitary flowers. They are showy and white. The sepals are narrow with the petals being truncate and glandless. The stamens are numerous, in 2 whorls each of 5 phalanges with basally fused filaments (stamen stalks), the outer whorl is antesepalous and longer than the inner.

The anthers are introrse (with opening toward the centre of flower), subasifixed, diamorphic (having two different forms), in outer whorl they are cordate at base and in the inner whorl, they are sagittate (arrow-head shaped).

The ovary is 2 locular, or incompletely so. The ovules are 2 seriate (arranged in rows) in each locule and numerous. The style is filiform (needle-like) and the stigma is punctiform (dot-like). The fruit capsule is 2 locular (or bivalved), brown when mature and one centimetre (0.39 in) in diameter. The capsule is also loculicidal (splits along an edge), globose or compressed contrary to the septum and sometimes winged along the line of dehiscence (splitting edge). The loculi, each with two rows of 8–20 flattened seeds and fitting between narrow membranous partitions.

The seeds are short winged, various per fruit, plants pubescent. The embryo (inside the seed) is flat, endosperm copious and oily.

== Taxonomy ==
The genus name of Mollia is in honour of Karl von Moll (1760–1838), an Austrian naturalist and statesman. The genus was first described and published in Nov. Gen. Sp. Pl. Bras. Vol.1 on page 96 in 1826.

The genus is recognized by the United States Department of Agriculture and the Agricultural Research Service, but they do not list any known species.

In the 1800s the genus was once placed within the family Tiliaceae, It was returned in the Malvales family in 1935.

It was placed within Grewioidaee subfamily due to molecular data (phospholipase gene) Blatter (unpulished source), but another author, Meijer thought it to be related to the Trichospermum genus due to similar capsule shapes.

The genus has been studied in 2021 and the various synonyms have been determined.

== Range and habitat ==
Its native range is southern Tropical America, and it is found in Bolivia, (northern, north-eastern and west central) Brazil, Colombia, Ecuador, Guyana, Peru and Venezuela.

It is found in the savannah forests of Cerrado, Brazil.

== Known species ==
about 18 species known, According to Kew:

- Mollia burchellii Sprague
- Mollia cuneata Baehni
- Mollia glabrescens Benth.
- Mollia globularis Meijer
- Mollia gracilis Spruce ex Benth.
- Mollia grandiflora Meijer
- Mollia lepidota Spruce ex Benth.
- Mollia longifolia Spruce ex Benth.
- Mollia lucens Baehni
- Mollia macrophylla Killip & Cuatrec.
- Mollia nitida Ducke
- Mollia paraensis Baehni
- Mollia speciosa Mart.
- Mollia tomentosa Spruce ex Benth.
- Mollia ulei Burret
- Mollia williamsii Baehni

Mollia glabrescens Benth. and Mollia nitida Ducke are listed by IUCN as 'Vulnerable'.
