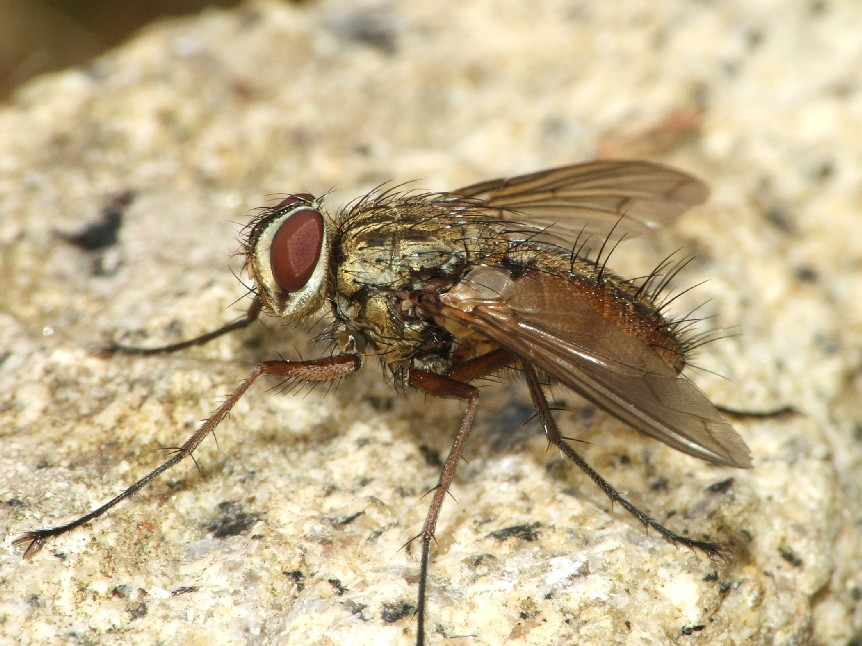
- Dexia rustica

Scientific classification
- Kingdom: Animalia
- Phylum: Arthropoda
- Class: Insecta
- Order: Diptera
- Family: Tachinidae
- Subfamily: Dexiinae
- Tribe: Dexiini
- Genus: Dexia; Meigen, 1826

Synonyms
- Asbellopsis Townsend, 1928; Barydexia Townsend, 1928; Calotheresia Townsend, 1926; Calotheresiopsis Baranov, 1932; Dexilla Westwood, 1840; Dexillina Kolomiets, 1969; Dexillosa Kolomiets, 1969; Eomyocera Townsend, 1926; Eomyoceropsis Townsend, 1926; Eoptilodexia Townsend, 1926; Ida Robineau-Desvoidy, 1863; Phasiodexia Townsend, 1925; Sumatrodexia Townsend, 1926

= Dexia (fly) =

Genus of flies

Dexia is a genus of flies in the family Tachinidae. Most larvae are parasitoids of beetles (Scarabaeidae).

== Species ==
- Dexia alticola Zhang & Shima, 2010
- Dexia atripes (Malloch, 1935)
- Dexia aurohumera Emden, 1947
- Dexia basifera Walker, 1859
- Dexia bivittata (Townsend, 1928)
- Dexia caldwelli Curran, 1927
- Dexia capensis Robineau-Desvoidy, 1830
- Dexia chaoi Zhang & Shima, 2010
- Dexia chinensis Zhang & Chen, 2010
- Dexia cuthbertsoni (Curran, 1941)
- Dexia divergens Walker, 1856
- Dexia extendens Walker, 1856
- Dexia flavida (Townsend, 1925)
- Dexia flavipes Coquillett, 1898
- Dexia formosana (Townsend, 1927)
- Dexia fraseri (Malloch, 1935)
- Dexia fulvifera Röder, 1893
- Dexia fusiformis Walker, 1853
- Dexia gilva Mesnil, 1980
- Dexia hainanensis Zhang, 2005
- Dexia inappendiculata Austen, 1909
- Dexia incisuralis (Baranov, 1932)
- Dexia kurahashii Zhang & Shima, 2010
- Dexia lepida Wiedemann, 1830
- Dexia longipennis (Townsend, 1926)
- Dexia longipes (Townsend, 1926)
- Dexia luzonensis (Townsend, 1928)
- Dexia major (Malloch, 1935)
- Dexia maritima Kolomiets, 1969
- Dexia montana (Baranov, 1932)
- Dexia monticola (Malloch, 1935)
- Dexia orphne Curran, 1927
- Dexia pandama Walker, 1849
- Dexia pandens Walker, 1849
- Dexia pollinosa Villeneuve, 1943
- Dexia prakritiae Lahiri, 2006
- Dexia quadristriata Lahiri, 2006
- Dexia rhodesia (Curran, 1941)
- Dexia rustica (Fabricius, 1775)
- Dexia seticincta Mesnil, 1980
- Dexia subflava Zhang, Pang & Zhao, 2006.
- Dexia subnuda (Malloch, 1935)
- Dexia tenuiforceps Zhang & Shima, 2010
- Dexia torneutopoda (Speiser, 1914)
- Dexia uelensis Emden, 1954
- Dexia uniseta Curran, 1927
- Dexia varivittata Curran, 1927
- Dexia velutina (Mesnil, 1953)
- Dexia ventralis Aldrich, 1925
- Dexia vicina (Mesnil, 1953)
- Dexia violovitshi Kolomiets, 1969
- Dexia vittata (Baranov, 1932)
