= Melolontha setifera =

Scientific classification
- Kingdom: Animalia
- Phylum: Arthropoda
- Clade: Pancrustacea
- Class: Insecta
- Order: Coleoptera
- Suborder: Polyphaga
- Infraorder: Scarabaeiformia
- Family: Scarabaeidae
- Tribe: Melolonthini
- Genus: Melolontha
- Species: M. setifera

Binomial name
- Melolontha setifera Li, 2010

Species of beetle

Melolontha setifera is a species of beetle of the family Scarabaeidae. It is found in Myanmar.

== Description ==
Adults reach a length of about 21.5 mm (0.85 in). The head, pronotum, scutellum, venter and legs are reddish brown, while the elytra are light olive green.

== Etymology ==
The species name is derived from Latin (seta and ferre) and refers to the distinctive character of the new species by bearing setae distributed within the elytral intervals that are uniquely featured among species of the guttigera group.
