= Melolontha chinensis =

Scientific classification
- Kingdom: Animalia
- Phylum: Arthropoda
- Clade: Pancrustacea
- Class: Insecta
- Order: Coleoptera
- Suborder: Polyphaga
- Infraorder: Scarabaeiformia
- Family: Scarabaeidae
- Tribe: Melolonthini
- Genus: Melolontha
- Species: M. chinensis

Binomial name
- Melolontha chinensis Guérin-Méneville, 1838

Synonyms
- Melolontha (Oplosternus) chinensis Guérin-Méneville, 1838; Hoplosternus heydeni Moser, 1913

Species of beetle

Melolontha chinensis is a species of beetle of the family Scarabaeidae. It is found in China (Guangdong, Hunan, Jiangxi, Sichuan, Xizang), India (Arunachal Pradesh) and Vietnam.

== Description ==
Adults reach a length of about 28 mm (1.1 in). They are similar to Melolontha japonica, but easily distinguished by the formation of the pygidium. The upper surface is covered with grey, appressed, bristle-like hairs.
