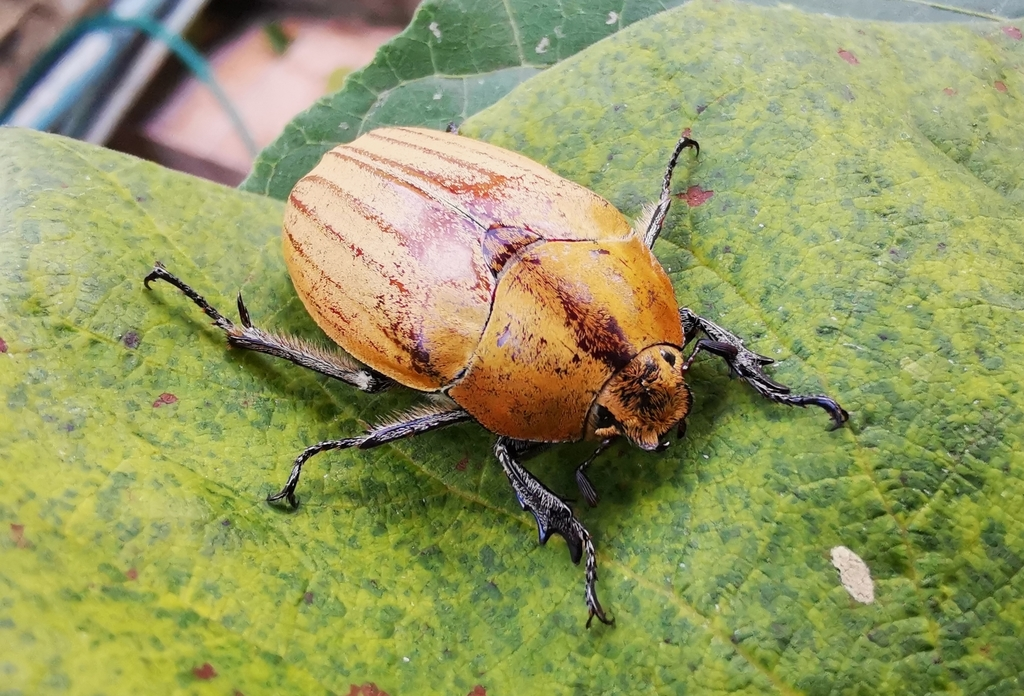

Scientific classification
- Kingdom: Animalia
- Phylum: Arthropoda
- Clade: Pancrustacea
- Class: Insecta
- Order: Coleoptera
- Suborder: Polyphaga
- Infraorder: Scarabaeiformia
- Family: Scarabaeidae
- Tribe: Melolonthini
- Genus: Melolontha
- Species: M. malaccensis

Binomial name
- Melolontha malaccensis (Moser, 1913)

Synonyms
- Hoplosternus malaccensis Moser, 1913

= Melolontha malaccensis =

Species of beetle

Melolontha malaccensis is a species of beetle of the family Scarabaeidae. It is found in Malaysia, Myanmar, Thailand and China (Yunnan).

== Description ==
Adults reach a length of about 35 mm (1.4 in). The keeled pygidium makes this species closely related to Melolontha carinata. However, the tip of the pygidium is neither forked nor emarginate, but rounded. The upper surface is densely covered with greyish-yellow or yellow scales. The scales are lanceolate, except for those on the head, which are bristle-like. The sides of the thorax are covered with greyish-yellow hairs, the center of the thorax is smooth and shiny except for a few bristle-like spots. The abdomen is very characteristically coloured. It is densely covered with yellowish-brown, bristle-like scales, the middle of the first four abdominal segments, as well as the posterior half of the middle of the fifth abdominal segment, are shiny and show only scattered bristle-like scales. The sides of the abdominal segments bear a large yellowish-white spot, and on the second to fourth abdominal segments, the scales next to the shiny center are also lighter in colour.
