= Melolontha insulana =

Scientific classification
- Kingdom: Animalia
- Phylum: Arthropoda
- Clade: Pancrustacea
- Class: Insecta
- Order: Coleoptera
- Suborder: Polyphaga
- Infraorder: Scarabaeiformia
- Family: Scarabaeidae
- Tribe: Melolonthini
- Genus: Melolontha
- Species: M. insulana

Binomial name
- Melolontha insulana (Moser, 1918)

Synonyms
- Hoplosternus insulanus Moser, 1918

Species of beetle

Melolontha insulana is a species of beetle of the family Scarabaeidae. It is found in Taiwan and possibly on the Korean Peninsula.

== Description ==
Adults reach a length of about 30 mm. The upper surface is brown and densely covered with grey or yellowish, bristle-like hairs. The underside is black or blackish-brown. The head is punctate and the pronotum, elytra and pygidium are densely and finely punctate, while the scutellum is sparsely punctate. Each elytron has three ribs. The middle of the thorax is extensive, while its sides are densely covered with grey hairs.
