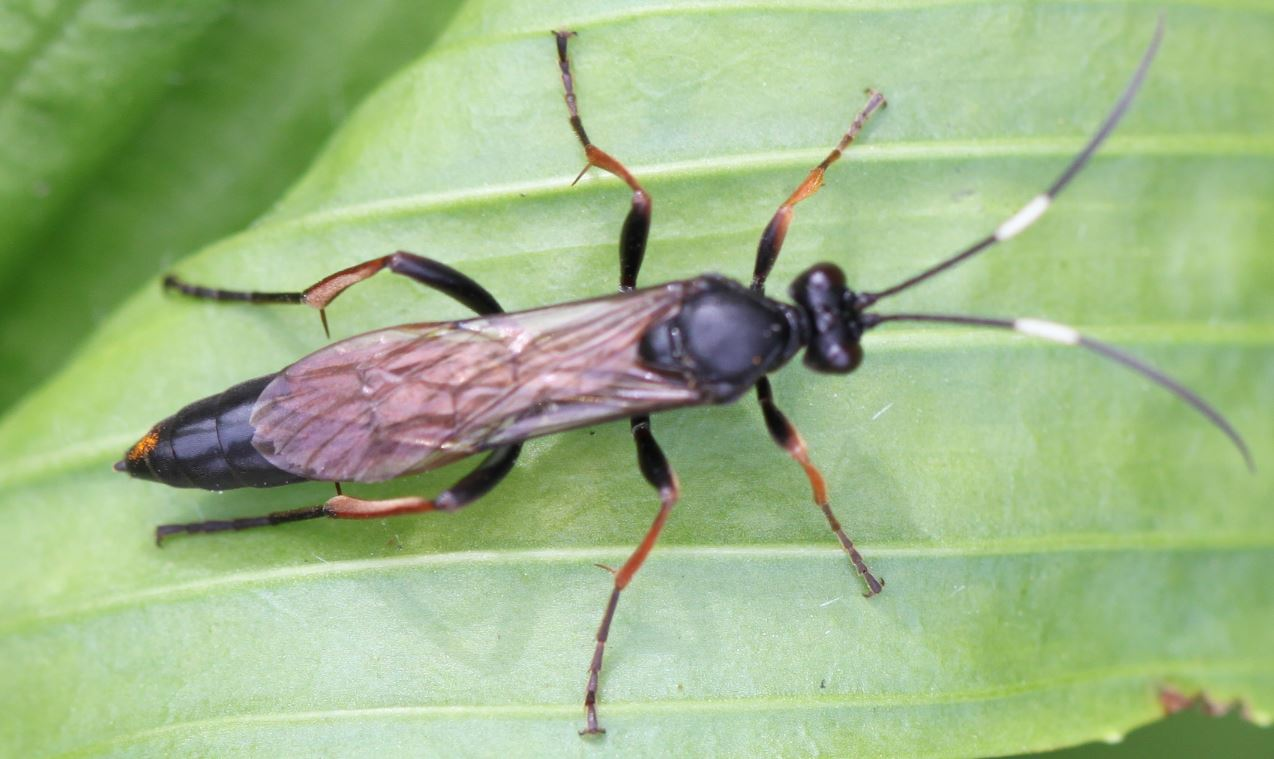
- Stenichneumon culpator

Scientific classification
- Kingdom: Animalia
- Phylum: Arthropoda
- Class: Insecta
- Order: Hymenoptera
- Family: Ichneumonidae
- Tribe: Ichneumonini
- Genus: Stenichneumon; Thomson, 1893

= Stenichneumon =

Genus of wasps

Stenichneumon is a genus of ichneumon wasps in the family Ichneumonidae. There are at least 20 described species in Stenichneumon.

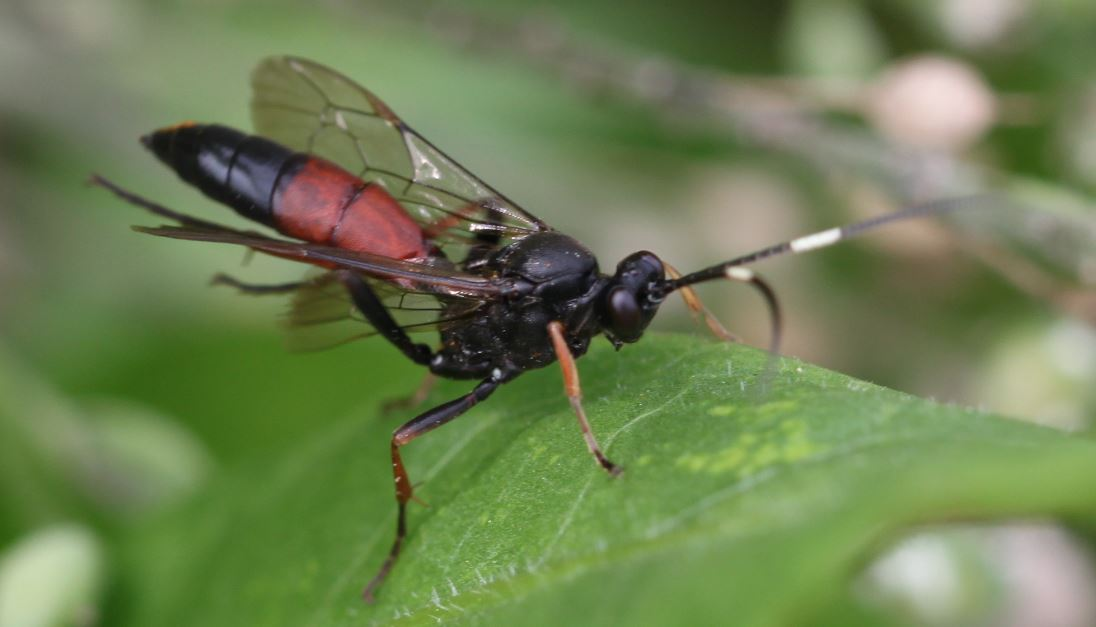
Stenichneumon culpator

== Species ==
These 23 species belong to the genus Stenichneumon:

- Stenichneumon affinis (Kokujev, 1927)^{c g}
- Stenichneumon alpicola (Kriechbaumer, 1872)^{c g}
- Stenichneumon annulicornis (Szépligeti, 1901)^{c g}
- Stenichneumon appropinquans (Cameron, 1897)^{c g}
- Stenichneumon crenatus (Berthoumieu, 1894)^{c g}
- Stenichneumon culpator (Schrank, 1802)^{c g b}
- Stenichneumon ephippiatus (Dalla Torre, 1902)^{c g}
- Stenichneumon exquisitus (Cresson, 1868)^{c g}
- Stenichneumon exsculptus (Habermehl, 1920)^{c g}
- Stenichneumon flavolineatus Uchida, 1926^{c g}
- Stenichneumon inexspectatus Heinrich, 1936^{c g}
- Stenichneumon laetabilis (Tosquinet, 1889)^{c g}
- Stenichneumon maculiceps (Cameron, 1904)^{c g}
- Stenichneumon maculitarsis (Cameron, 1903)^{c g}
- Stenichneumon militarius (Thunberg, 1822)^{c g}
- Stenichneumon nigriorbitalis Uchida, 1930^{c g}
- Stenichneumon odaiensis Uchida, 1932^{c}
- Stenichneumon pallidipennis (Viereck, 1902)^{c g}
- Stenichneumon posticalis (Matsumura, 1912)^{c g}
- Stenichneumon ringii (Holmgren, 1884)^{c g}
- Stenichneumon salvus (Cresson, 1877)^{c g}
- Stenichneumon seticornis (Tischbein, 1868)^{c g}
- Stenichneumon ussuriensis Heinrich, 1980^{c g}

Data sources: i = ITIS, c = Catalogue of Life, g = GBIF, b = Bugguide.net
