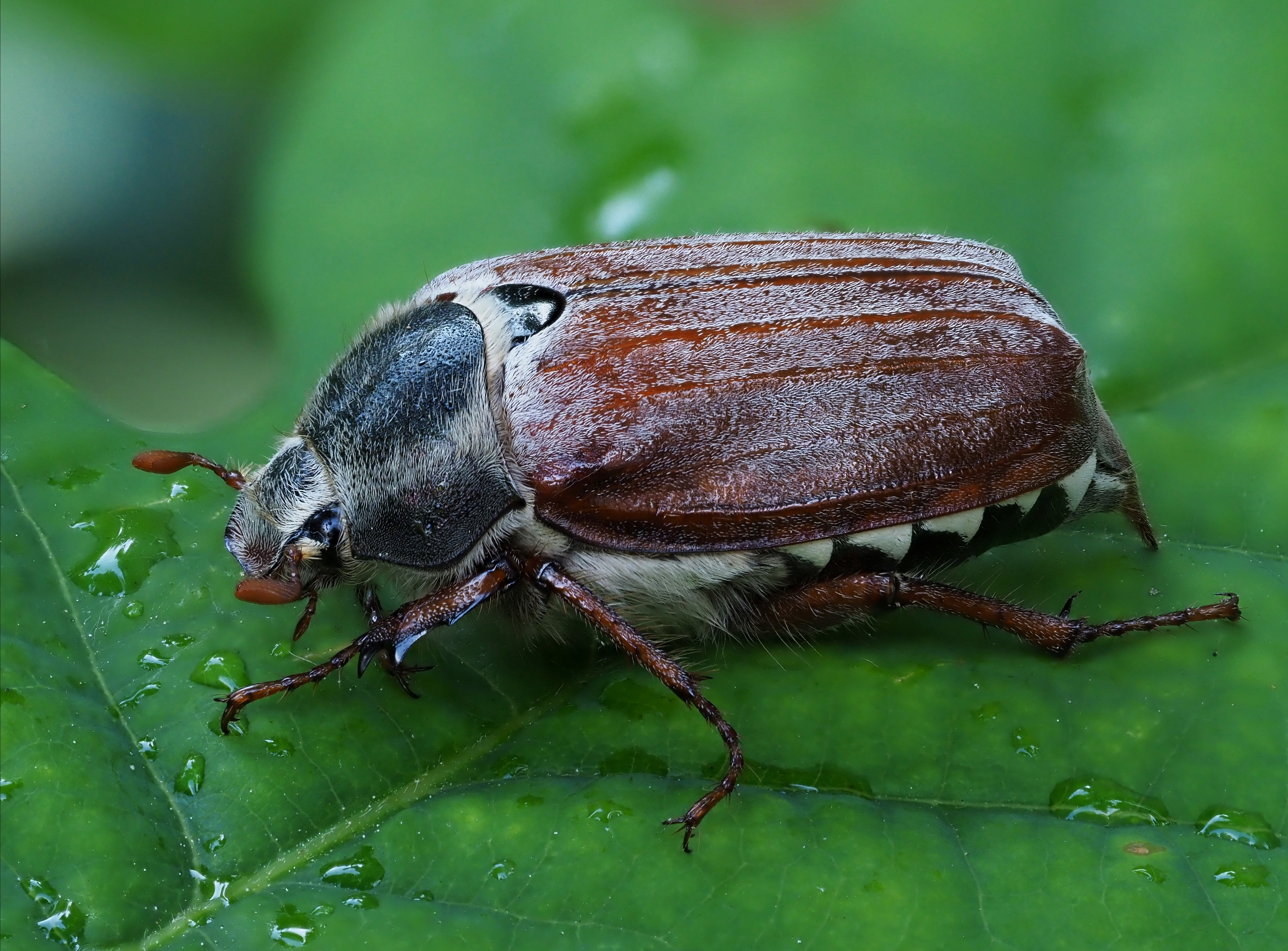
- Female

Scientific classification
- Kingdom: Animalia
- Phylum: Arthropoda
- Clade: Pancrustacea
- Class: Insecta
- Order: Coleoptera
- Suborder: Polyphaga
- Infraorder: Scarabaeiformia
- Family: Scarabaeidae
- Tribe: Melolonthini
- Genus: Melolontha
- Species: M. melolontha

Binomial name
- Melolontha melolontha (Linnaeus, 1758)

Synonyms
- Scarabaeus melolontha Linnaeus, 1758; Melolontha vulgaris Fabricius, 1775; Scarabaeus majalis Moll, 1785; Melolontha albida Mulsant, 1842; Melolontha nigritarsis Pfanneberg, 1905; Melolontha melolontha colpopyga Petz, 1905; Melolontha redtenbacheri Dalla Torre, 1912; Melolontha melolontha amblypyga Lomnicky, 1923

= Cockchafer =

Common cockchafer

Species of scarab beetle

The common cockchafer (Melolontha melolontha), known colloquially as the Maybug, (Note: Other names include: bracken clock, bummler, chovy, cob-worm, dorrs, dumbledarey, dumbledore, humbuz, June bug, kittywitch, billy witch, may-bittle, midsummer dor, mitchamador, oak-wib, rookworm, snartlegog, spang beetle, tom beedel and chwilen y bwm (Welsh).) Maybeetle, or doodlebug, among many other names, is a species of scarab beetle belonging to the genus Melolontha. It is native to Europe, and it is also one of the several closely-related and morphologically similar species of Melolontha called cockchafers, alongside Melolontha hippocastani (the forest cockchafer), with which it shares several physical and behavioural characteristics, including sexual dimorphism, mating practices, and its lamellae.

The mating behaviour is controlled by pheromones. The males usually swarm during the mating season while the females stay put and feed on leaves. When cockchafers feed, they cause leaves to release green leaf volatiles, which the males can detect and thus locate females for mating. The larvae use both the plant volatiles and CO_{2} to locate the plant root for food.

The cockchafer develops via metamorphosis, in which the beetle undergoes stages of eggs, larvae, pupae and adults, and it is also an important and nutritious food source for many predators. The adults and larvae feed on plants, and are regarded as agricultural pests of crops such as grasses and fruit trees. Adults have harmful effects for the crop when they aggregate in large groups. The larvae can cause severe damage and kill the plant by gnawing the plant roots.

== Etymology ==
The name cockchafer derives from the late-17th-century usage of cock (in the sense of expressing size or vigour) + chafer which simply means an insect of this type, referring to its propensity for gnawing and damaging plants. The term chafer has its root in Old English ceafor or cefer, of Germanic origin and is related to the Dutch kever, all of which mean gnawer as it relates to the jaw. The term melolontha is derived from the Ancient Greek word mēlolónthē which means cockchafer.

== Taxonomic history ==
Melolontha melolontha was first named by Carl Linnaeus as Scarabaeus melolontha in 1758. He described it as hornless and testaceous with a hairy thorax, a bent tail, and a white abdomen. Fabricius in 1775 later named it as Melolontha vulgaris; remarking that its larvae are a root-eater, that it can be preyed on by mouse-eared bats, and that it can foretell diseases in the autumn. Moll in 1785 named the cockchafer as Scarabaeus majalis and observed that the beetles were brownish-red or multicolored.

In the 19th century, Étienne Mulsant named it as Melolontha albida and differentiated between the male and the female. In 1884, Friedrich Westhoff distinguished numerous subspecies, namely–Melolontha melolontha funesta, M. m. humeralis, M. m. luctuosa, M. m. melanopus, M. m. obscuripes, and M. m. scapularis.

In the 20th century, Georg Pfanneberg named the species Melolontha nigritarsis because the observed specimen caught in May 1903 had completely black tarsi. In 1905, Josef Petz observing a specimen caught the previous year, described a new subspecies which had a sharp deviation at the tip of its pygidium, naming it M. melolontha colpopyga. Karl Wilhelm von Dalla Torre in 1912 named a variation of the species M. redtenbacheri. In 1923, Jarosław Łomnicki found the female to have a blunt pygidium tip which varied from the one observed by Petz, and it also had an acutely posterior pronotum, and flat hairs on its pygidium. He named this M. melolontha amblypyga.

== Description ==
=== Adults ===
The adult cockchafer reaches 25 to 30 mm (1.0 to 1.2 in) in length. It has a dark head with two segmented antennae. Behind the head, it has a dark pronotum covered with short hairs. This black coloration distinguishes it from its close relative M. hippocastani, whose pronotum is brown. The top of its body has reddish-brown elytra and it has a black abdomen which is partly white on the sides. Male cockchafers have seven flattened leaflike extensions on their antennae, whereas females have only six. The insect's antennae are large and fan-like with the male's larger than those of the female's. Genetically, according to a research study from 2024, M. melolontha is historically divergent to M. hippocastani, and intraspecifically it was also found to have a higher genetic differentiation than the latter.

=== Larvae ===
M. melolontha larvae typically have three stages of development over the course of 3–4 years. In the first stage (L1), the larva is 10–20 mm (0.4–0.8 in) long, growing to 30–35 mm (1.2–1.4 in) in the second year of development (L2), and reaching 40–46 mm (1.6–1.8 in) in its final year of development (L3) before emerging. In some areas of Eastern Europe, larval development lasts four years. It has a white body, black at the abdominal extremity, which curves into a C-shaped arc, and long, hairy, well-developed legs. The larva also has a large brown head with strong, grabbing mandibles, and relies on its olfactory and contact chemosensory senses for underground foraging.

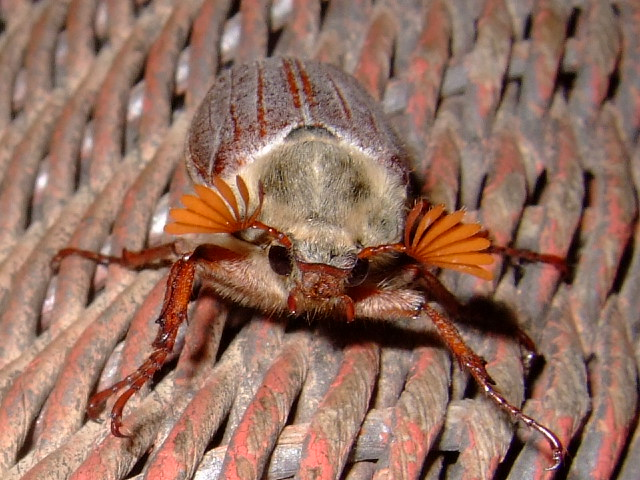
Detail of a male cockchafer, showing the seven leaflike extensions on each antenna

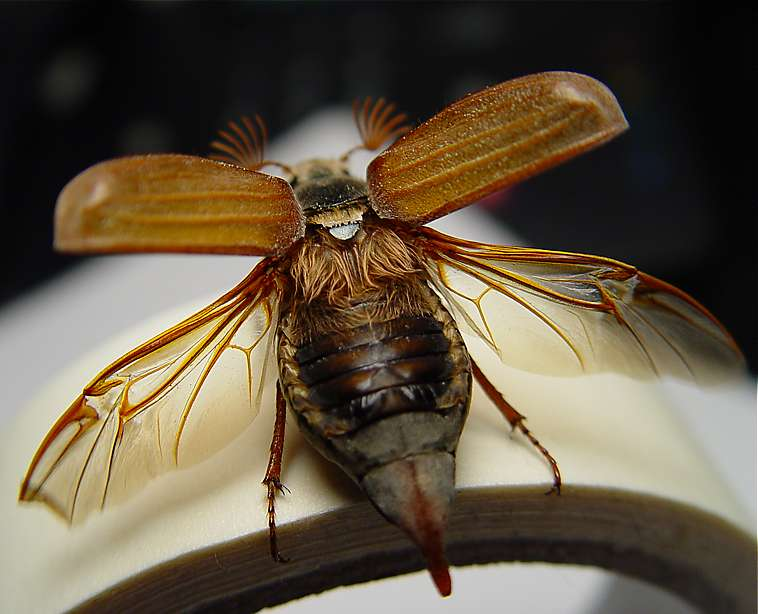
A female cockchafer showing its wingspan and six leaflike extensions on each antenna

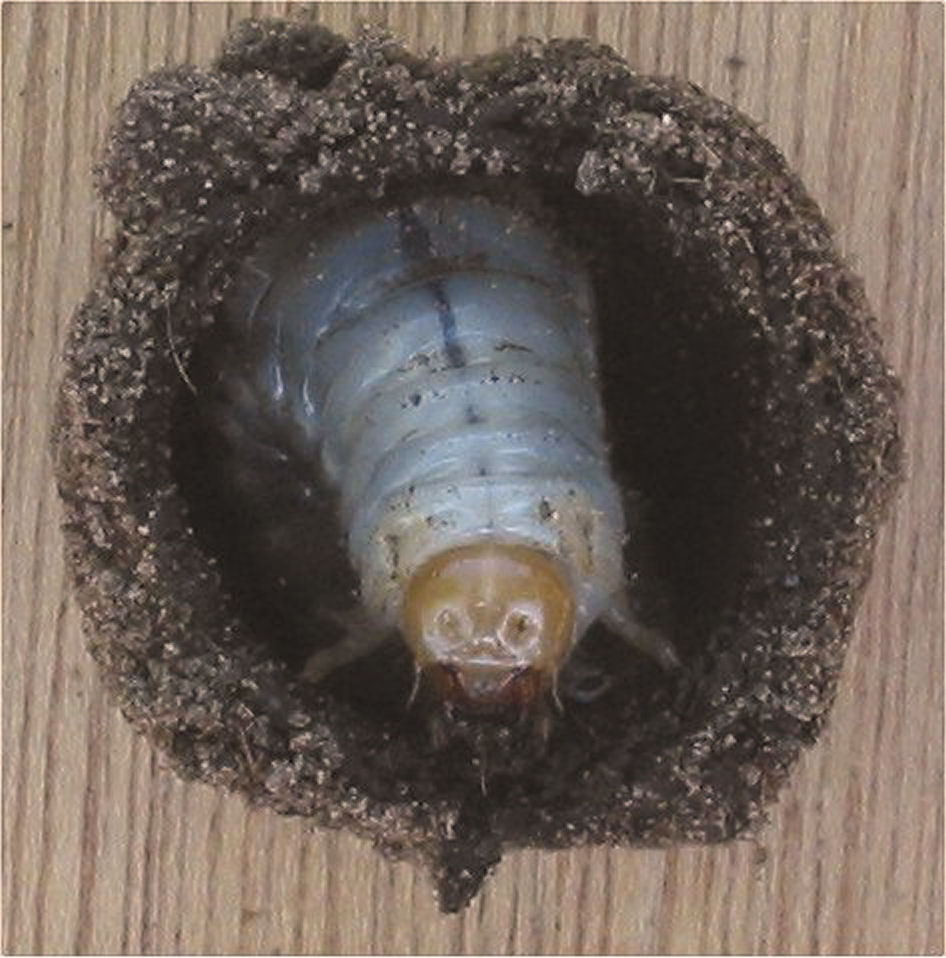
A white brown-headed larva (grub) of the cockchafer as seen in its cocoon

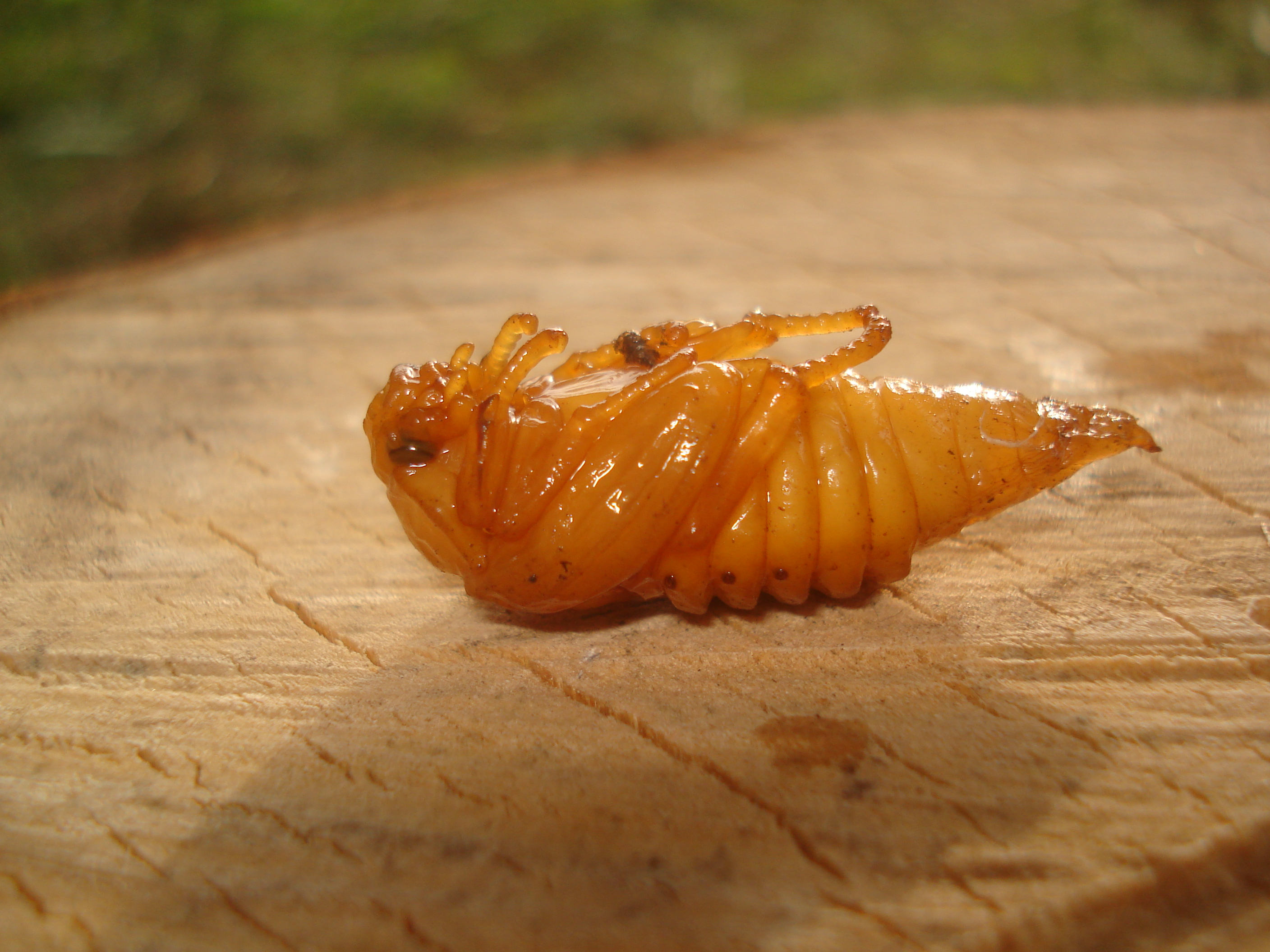
Pupa (or cocoon) of the cockchafer

== Distribution and habitat ==
The cockchafer is widespread across Europe, particularly in temperate regions with suitable soil conditions for larval development. It has also been reported in parts of Asia, including Turkey and the Caucasus region. Geographical barriers, climatic conditions, and ecological factors may limit the cockchafer's dispersal; it does not occur in the mountainous regions of Tyrol, for example, because it cannot survive at the high altitudes and low temperatures of the Alps. It typically disperses no more than 2 to 3 km (1.2 to 1.9 mi) from where it emerges and remains in close proximity to the fields or grasslands where it occurs.

== Life cycle ==
The adult cockchafer appears between late April and early June and lives for about five to seven weeks. After two to three weeks, the female begins laying eggs, typically depositing them in fields at a depth of around 15–25 cm (6–10 in). Each female may repeat this process until it has laid between 60 and 80 eggs. Adults feed primarily on the leaves of oak, sycamore, maple, hornbeam, beech and plum trees, and occasionally on other trees, including the chestnut.

The larva, known as a "chafer grub" or "white grub", hatches four to six weeks after the egg is laid, and feeds on the roots of plants, including the potato. The grub develops underground for three to four years, or up to five years in colder climates, growing to a length of approximately 4–5 cm (1.6–2.0 in). It then pupates in the summer, developing into an adult cockchafer over the following six weeks.

The adult cockchafer overwinters in the earth by staying in its pupal chamber at depths usually between 5 to 40 cm (2 to 16 in) although it may be found as deep as 100 cm (40 in). It emerges in spring, from April to May.

Cockchafer populations undergo periodic fluctuations in abundance, with particularly large emergences occurring every three or four years, depending on the region. Historically, an additional cycle of approximately 30–40 years was observed, during which populations reached unusually high levels.

== Behaviour and ecology ==
=== Mating ===
The male cockchafer leaves the soil when the temperature becomes favourable, in April or May. At dusk, it swarms around groups of trees at forest edges, continuing until darkness. The swarms typically do minimal damage to the trees, but are occasionally harmful in cherry or plum orchards because of their consumption of blossoms. The female stays in place and feeds on leaves until reaching sexual maturity. The male primarily flies among the branches in search of females. Mating lasts for several hours. Once the female has matured and mated, it returns to the fields to lay its eggs 15 to 25 cm (6 to 10 in) in the soil in a batch of 10 to 38 eggs, remaining in the soil for 2 to 4 days after laying. Only a third of females survive the first round of egg-laying, but survivors make a second, and occasionally third, trip to the field to lay further eggs. The length of time for the cockchafer's eggs to mature depends on temperature—5 to 8 days at 27 °C (81 °F) and 23 to 32 days at 15 °C (59 °F).

=== Environmental and chemical influences ===
Environmental factors such as prevailing soil temperature and humidity have a considerable impact on the existence and behaviour of cockchafers. Soil temperature influences the duration of development, while temperature and humidity affect the vertical movement of larvae between the upper and deeper soil layers. Adult cockchafers feed on a variety of deciduous trees and shrubs, including oak, maple, beech and hazelnut.

Green leaf volatiles (GLVs) are compounds released by plants that attract the cockchafer. They have been found to act as a sexual kairomone which helps adults to find mates. They do this by enhancing the attractiveness of toluquinone, a sex pheromone released by female scarab beetles to attract males. Only males are attracted to GLVs, in particular (Z)-3-hexen-1-ol, (E)-2-hexen-1-ol and 1-hexanol, and they use their release to identify leaves on which females are feeding. M. melolontha males are sensitive to lower GLV concentrations than females, possibly due to the anatomical differences between their antennae. The males hover around the foliage during mating season, while females remain on twigs and branches to feed. This makes the cockchafer the first reported insect utilising both the sex pheromone and plant volatiles for mating. GLVs are being investigated as a possible pest control technique to attract males and prevent mating.

=== Pest ===
Though the adult cockchafer can cause some damage to fruit trees, the larva is the primary agricultural pest. It hatches from its egg 4–6 weeks after laying and develops into an adult over the course of 3–4 years. Immediately after hatching, it gnaws on small roots. Over three larval stages, the larva feeds on roots, particularly grasses, cereals, and other crops, only pausing to burrow deep into the soil for winter hibernation.

The M. melolontha larva uses chemical cues to locate plant roots, including soluble compounds such as sugars, amino acids and isoflavonoids found in the rhizosphere. First-instar larvae are also attracted to CO_{2} released by respiring plant roots and soil microorganisms. Damage caused by the first-instar larva is generally only noticeable at extremely high densities, exceeding 1,000/m^{2} (93/sq ft). However, older larvae can cause substantial damage at much lower densities. Strawberry crops are particularly susceptible to damage from cockchafer larvae, which feed on their roots. Feeding damage is greatest during the second year of development, when the larva enters its third instar, and is less severe in the following year. The larva smells using pore plates (also known as lamellae) on its antennae. These have a thin layer of cells over sensory units consisting of dendrite bundles. The larva can identify CO_{2} and plant volatiles. It pushes its head into the walls of its burrow and probes with its antennae, likely to taste the soil with bristle-like sensilla. The larva can move horizontally through the soil by up to 30 cm (12 in) per day.

=== Intestinal components and microbiome ===
The gut enzymes and microbiota of M. melolontha larvae allows them to exploit a variety of ecological niches such as dead tree trunks, rotting organic matter, and freshly growing roots in the soil. There are two major compartments in the melolontha larvae's intestinal tract. The first is a tubular midgut that secretes hydrolytic enzymes for the breakdown of macromolecules, and the second is a bulbous hindgut which is generally used for fermentation. In most M. melolontha individuals, midgut bacterial diversity was lower than in the diet, suggesting that its midgut enzymes lyse dietary bacteria during digestion.

In its midgut, M. melolontha has enzymes which have been found to deactivate β-D-glucopyranosyl ester (or TA-G), a defense compound present in dandelion, by separating the sugar from TA-G using beta-glucosidase. This reduces the toxic effect of TA-G when consumed by the cockchafer but at the same time the compound becomes deterrent, leaving dandelion roots less likely to be eaten. Trypsin-like enzymes from the midgut of M. melolontha have been found to break down certain bacterial toxins and inactivate them. Cysteine-proteinase and Aspartyl proteinase are enzymes also forming a part of the midgut juice in cockchafers and help it to digest Cry8C toxin, which is found in B. t. japonensis, a subspecies of Bacillus thuringiensis. The hindgut in cockchafer larvae has a low concentration of glucose and high concentration of acetate, which is caused by high fermentation or low hydrolysis of recalcitrant residues such as cellulose. Its midgut has high concentrations of both glucose as well as acetate.Acetate, a major product of anaerobic fermentation, is produced by the bacteria found in hindgut.

Some research on the M. melolontha microbiome has been focused on increasing the entomopathogenic properties of nematodes so that the latter can be used as a pest control due to their symbiotic nature. Bacteria such as Xenorhabdus nematophila are transported by nematodes and released into the insect's midgut. The bacteria will release lytic enzymes and other antimicrobial substances to decrease competition from the beetle's native microbiome. This creates an optimal environment for nematode development. Bacterial species in the midgut of M. melolontha such as Pseudomonas chlororaphis have been found to fight back, acting as antagonists to entomopathogenic bacteria which include X. nematophila. These bacteria have been identified differentially in different larval stages, with P. chlororaphis usually being found in the third and final larval stage.

== History of control as a pest ==
In 1320, a notable event took place in which cockchafers were brought before a court in Avignon, France, and ordered to leave the town for a designated area. Those that failed to comply were reportedly collected and killed. This was an example of the medieval practice of conducting legal proceedings against agricultural pests, which could involve religious curses, banishment orders and ritual executions. Before the widespread adoption of chemical pesticides, the main mechanism to control the cockchafer population was to control and kill adult beetles in large numbers. One account notes that in 1911 more than 20 million cockchafer individuals were collected in a forest area of 18 km^{2} (6.9 square miles) and killed.

In the 19th century, cockchafers were reportedly consumed in different parts of Europe. They were consumed raw, sugared, candied, or in soup which tasted similar to crab soup. While the soup was eaten back then, the reports of the soup being widely popular were found to be a myth. In Sweden, the peasants determined the severity of upcoming winter by judging the body coloration of the cockchafer larva (or grub). Therefore, they called it Bemärkelse-mask, meaning the "prognostic worm".

Alongside the development of modern agriculture, a number of toxic chemical pesticides have been developed, notably Lindane and DDT. These, together with an increase of farming land, led to a decrease in cockchafer populations, especially in Europe, from the 1940s to the 1970s. Numbers began to recover in some areas of Europe after the ban of these highly toxic pesticides. As part of efforts to reduce the environmental impact of pesticides, the European Union has generally prohibited aerial pesticide spraying, subject to limited exceptions, and promotes more sustainable pest management methods. The control methods, which are now commonly used, are light traps, Azadirachtin, soil netting, soil tilling, sex pheromones, and, more recently, entomopathogens.

== Interaction with other species ==
=== Diet ===
Cockchafer feeds on deciduous tree and fruit tree leaves, including oak, beech, maple, sweet chestnut, plum, and walnut trees. Meanwhile, the cockchafer larvae feed on the roots of field plants such as grains, grasses, trees, beetroots, and a large part of crop rootlets such as those of potatoes.

=== Predators ===
The European mole is a natural predator of cockchafers and are known to feed on its larvae. The mole can detect the latter using its keen sense of smell and its specialised digging behaviour. This predation can help regulate cockchafer populations in mole-inhabited areas.

M. melolontha adults are predated by ground beetles (Carabidae) and ants (Formicidae). Larvae are predated by click beetles (Elateridae) while underground. Starlings, crows, and gulls also predate M. melolontha larvae, often after a field has been plowed.

=== Parasites ===
Dexia rustica is a parasitic fly that uses M. melolontha larvae as its host. D. rustica eggs hatch underground and search for hibernating cockchafer larvae (or grub). Their presence will ultimately kill the beetle larvae in spring when the fly hibernates. About 30 to 35 cm (0.98 to 1.15 ft) below the ground, over 10 percent of the grubs (or larvae) can be parasitised by one to six D. rustica.

== Relationship with humans ==
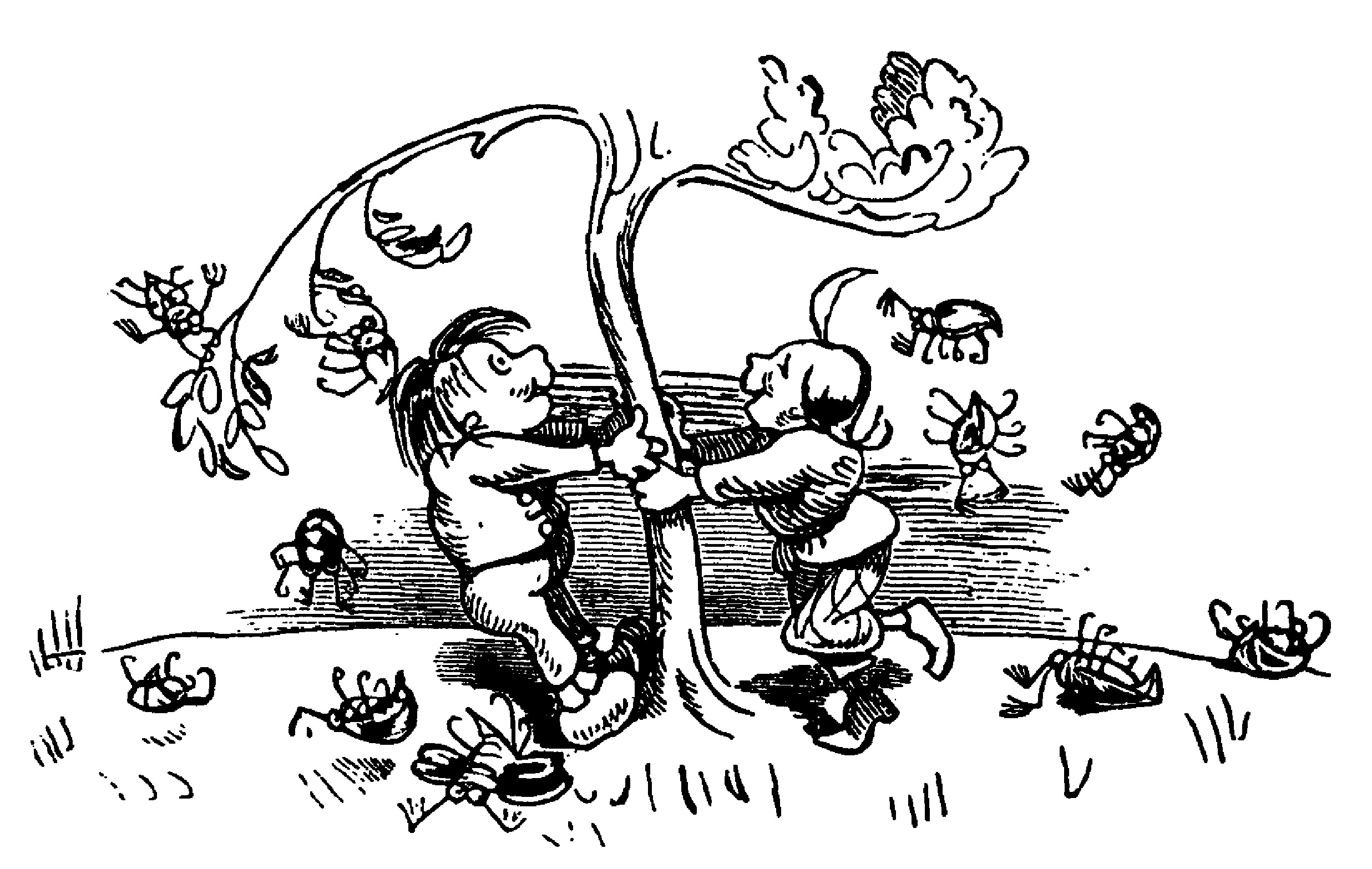
Max and Moritz shaking cockchafers from a tree

Children since antiquity have played with cockchafers. In ancient Greece, boys caught the insect, tied a linen thread to its feet and set it free, amusing themselves to watch it fly in spirals. English boys in Victorian times played a very similar game by sticking a pin through one of its wings. Nikola Tesla recalled that as a child he made one of his first inventions, an engine, made by harnessing four cockchafers to a crosspiece and then transmitting the motion to a large disc to derive power.

In arts and culture, cockchafers appear in the fairy tales "Thumbelina" by Hans Christian Andersen and "Princess Rosette" by Madame d'Aulnoy. The cockchafer is featured in a German lullaby called Maikäfer flieg!. It is tuned to another German lullaby, "Schlaf, Kindlein, schlaf" (or Sleep, Baby, sleep), and is similar to the English "Ladybird, Ladybird":

Maikäfer, flieg,
Dein Vater ist im Kriege,
Dein Mutter ist in Pommerland,
Pommerland ist abgebrannt!
Maikäfer, flieg!

Translation:

Maybug, fly
Your father is at war,
Your mother is in Pomerania,
Pomerania is burnt down!
Maybug, fly!

The verse, dated back to c. 1800, is associated with childhood war trauma and became popular again after World War II in Germany. It also appeared in other German songs and folk stories, for example Max and Moritz. In Germany, it was commonly seen during the opening years of World War II, particularly during the Battle of France.

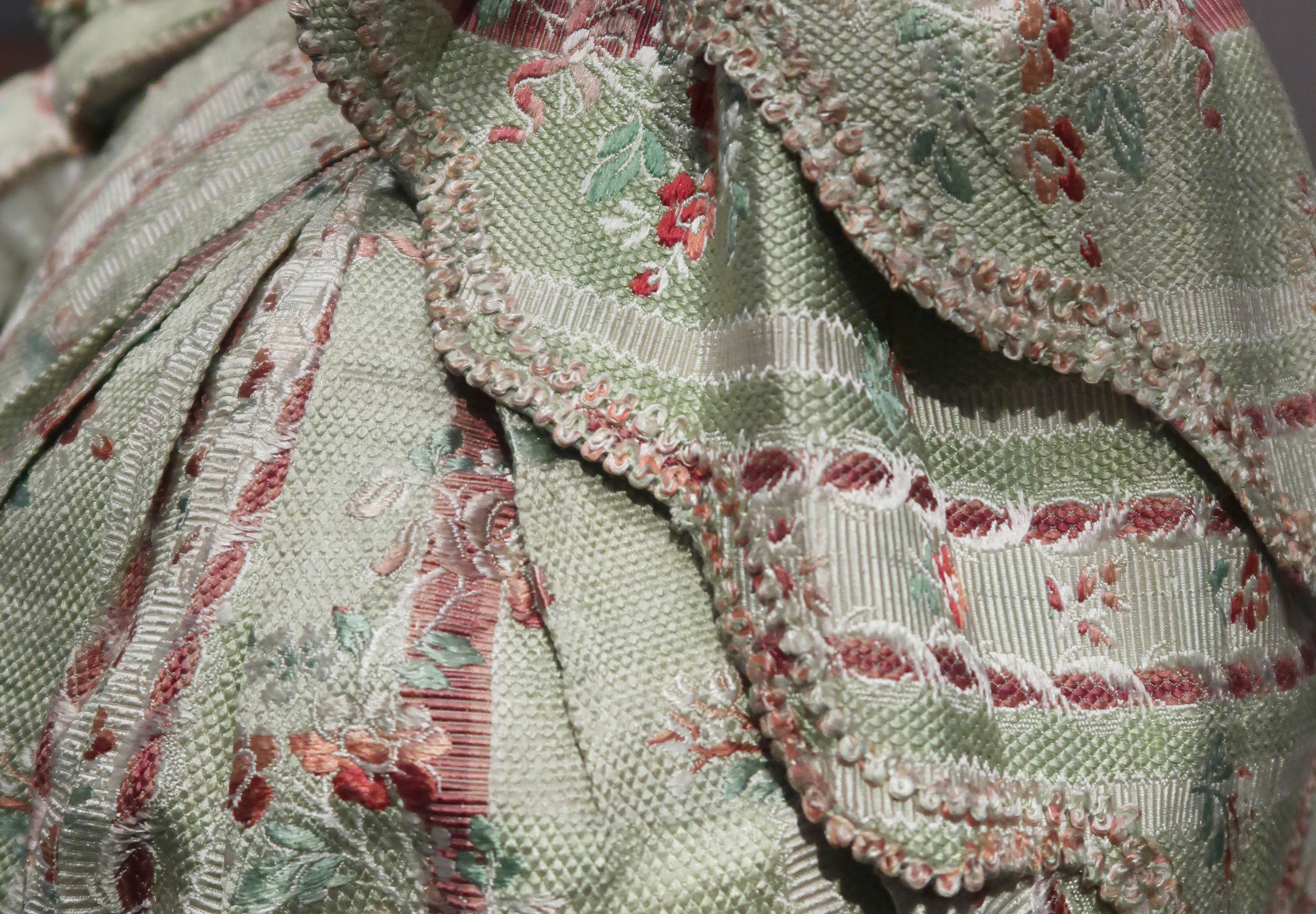
Example of decorative trim, sourcils de hanneton, meaning 'cockchafer eyebrows'.

According to one source, the dumbledore in Thomas Hardy's 1899 poem An August Midnight is a cockchafer. However, in his novel The Mayor of Casterbridge, Hardy uses the dialect word dumbledore to mean a bumble bee. This was also confirmed in an interview by Harry Potter's author, J. K. Rowling. Also in the United Kingdom, there have been four Royal Navy ships named HMS Cockchafer.

In the 18th century France, decorative trims of women's dresses in various shapes were known as sourcils de hanneton, meaning 'cockchafer eyebrows'. This referred to the beetles fan-like antennae that resembled the decorative trim made with knotted silk floss. It was also seen in the dresses of French royal court including Marie Antoinette's, as prepared by her dressmaker, Madame Eloffe, and the fashion designer, Rose Bertin. Although not widely consumed, cockchafer soup was considered a delicacy in France and Germany until the mid-20th century.

== See also ==
- Red-headed cockchafer, native to Australia
