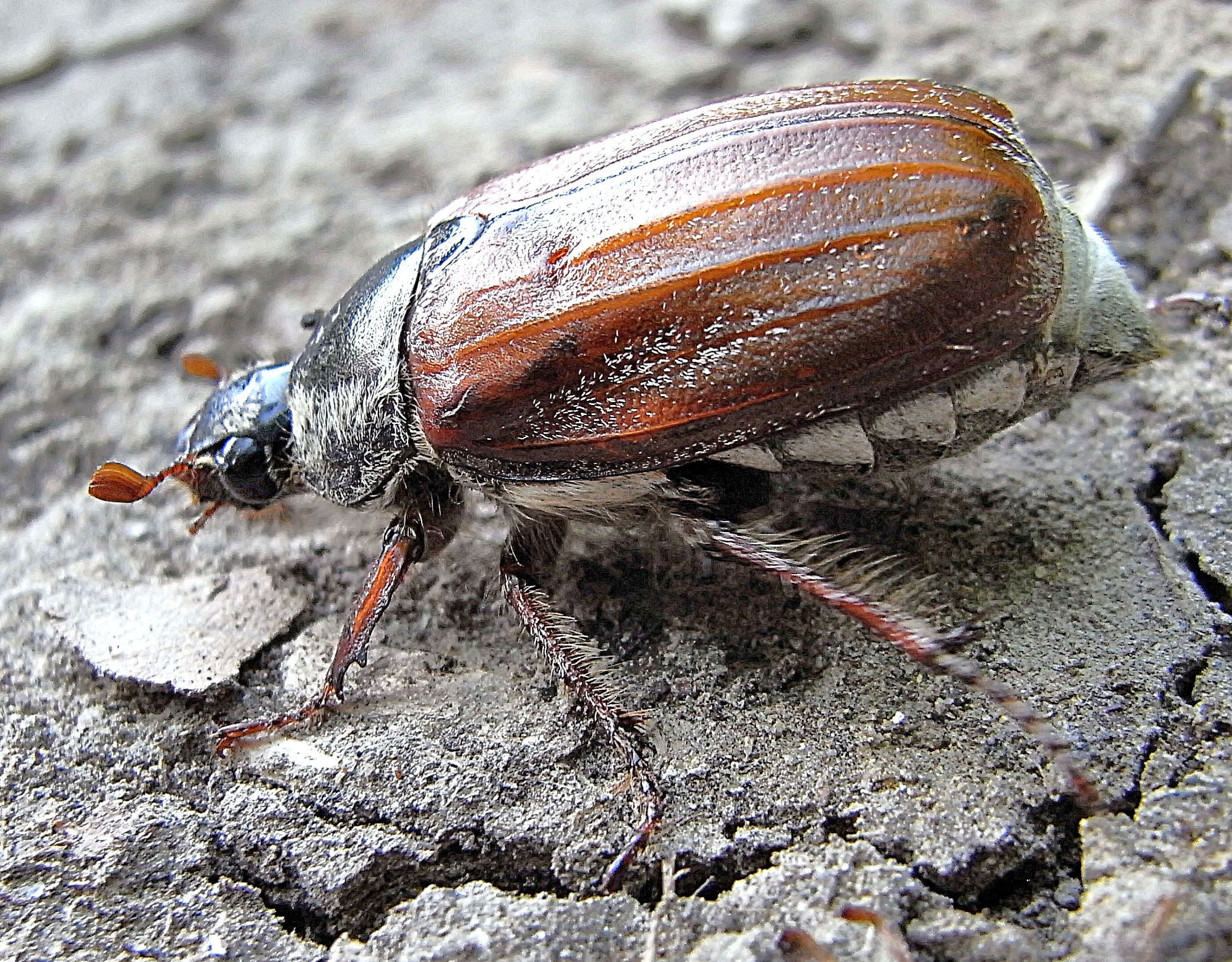

Scientific classification
- Kingdom: Animalia
- Phylum: Arthropoda
- Clade: Pancrustacea
- Class: Insecta
- Order: Coleoptera
- Suborder: Polyphaga
- Infraorder: Scarabaeiformia
- Family: Scarabaeidae
- Tribe: Melolonthini
- Genus: Melolontha
- Species: M. pectoralis

Binomial name
- Melolontha pectoralis Megerle von Mühlfeld, 1812

Synonyms
- Melolontha kraatzi Reitter, 1906; Melolontha pectoralis fosca Reitter, 1902; Melolontha pectoralis jlsia Reitter, 1902; Melolontha pectoralis satema Reitter, 1902; Melolontha persica Reitter, 1902; Melolontha tibialis persica Reitter, 1902; Melolontha tibialis brenskei Reitter, 1902; Melolontha vulgaris velepitica Müller, 1902; Melolontha vulgaris asiatica Brenske, 1900; Melolontha pectoralis nigritulus Kraatz, 1885; Melolontha pectoralis rufithorax Kraatz, 1885; Melolontha tibialis Kraatz, 1882; Melolontha soror Marseul, 1879; Melolontha spatulata Ballion, 1871; Melolontha aceris Erichson, 1848; Melolontha extorris Erichson, 1848; Melolontha rhenana Bach, 1845; Melolontha albida pulverea Mulsant, 1842; Melolontha farinosa Kraatz, 1864; Melolontha fuscotestacea Reitter, 1887; Melolontha albida Laporte, 1840

= Melolontha pectoralis =

Species of beetle

Melolontha pectoralis, the European large cockchafer, is a species of beetle of the family Scarabaeidae.

== Description ==
Adults reach a length of about 20–28 mm (0.79–1.10 in).

== Subspecies ==
- Melolontha pectoralis pectoralis (Albania, Armenia, Austria, Azerbaijan, Bosnia Herzegovina, Bulgaria, Croatia, Czech Republic, Denmark, France, Georgia, Germany, Greece, Hungary, Iran, Italy, Macedonia, Montenegro, Poland, Romania, Russia, Serbia, Slovakia, Slovenia, Turkey, Ukraine)
- Melolontha pectoralis farinosa Kraatz, 1864 (Albania, Bulgaria, Greece, Macedonia)
