= Cockchafer soup =

European soup made from insect pests

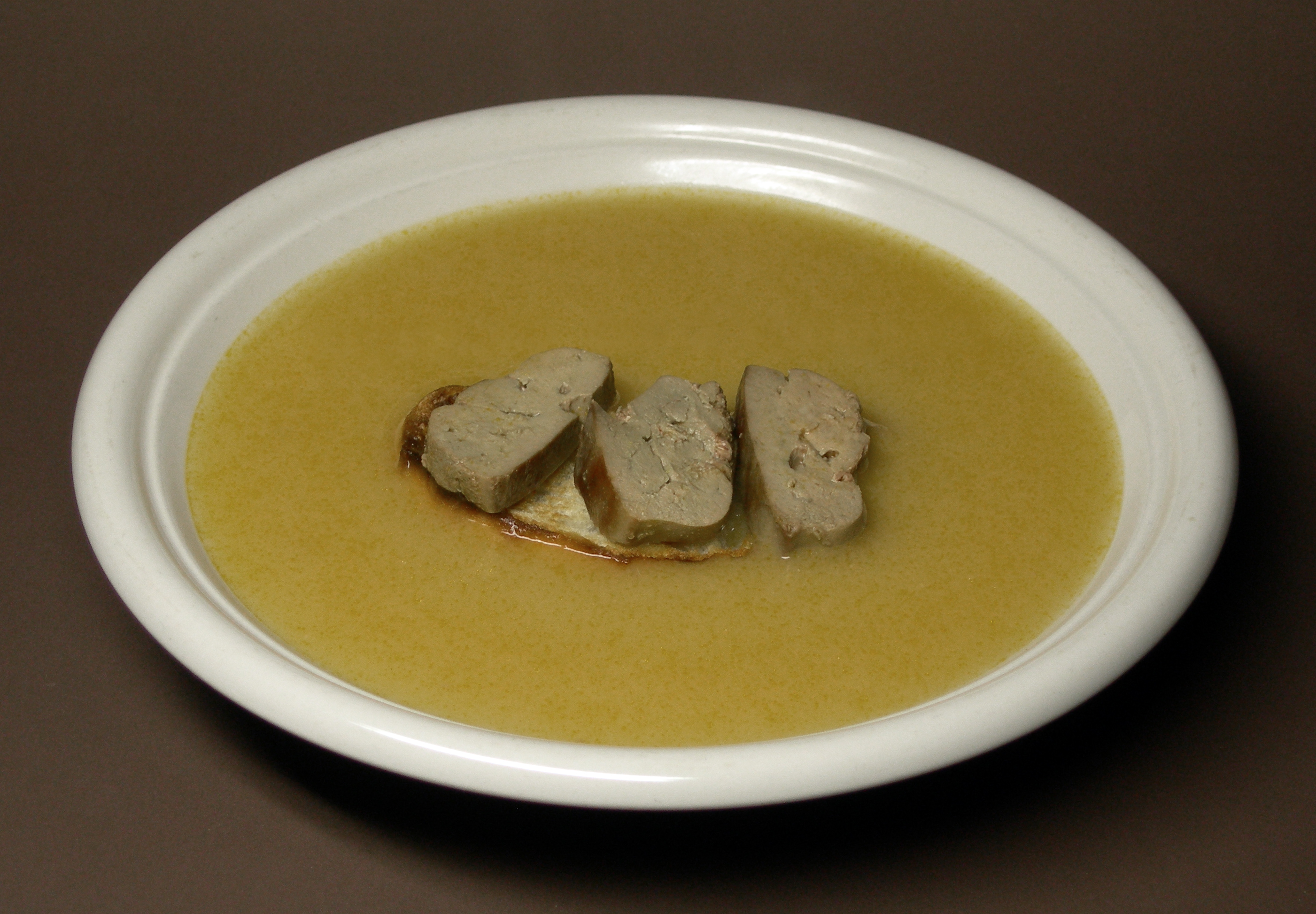
"Mockchafer soup" made with crab meat in place of cockchafers, and served with toasted bread and liver

Cockchafer soup is a European dish made from the cockchafer beetle. Cockchafers were once a common pest insect in Europe, with population explosions every four years.

The origins of cockchafer soup extend back at least as early as 1844, when German medical officer Johann Joseph Schneider reported that in his hometown of Fulda in Hesse cockchafers were regularly consumed raw, as well as sugared, candied and in soup. Schneider described the flavour of the soup as similar to crab soup. However, it is unclear how prevalent the consumption of cockchafers including in soup really was (all recipes for cockchafer soup in German are based on Schneider's 1844 version), and it has been suggested that its prevalence has been exaggerated since the 19th century by newspaper stories due to its shocking and sensational nature, leading to it being described as a "myth".

Excessive pesticide usage caused their populations to collapse by the 1970s, with complete extirpation in many areas.

== Preparation ==
According to a French recipe from the 1800s, a batch of cockchafer soup requires 500 grams of the insect with their legs and wings removed. They are fried in butter, then cooked in a chicken or veal broth. The soup can be strained and eaten as a boullion, or crushed cockchafers can be mixed with egg yolk and roux. The soup was served with slices of veal liver or dove breast and with croutons. A single serving contains approximately 30 beetles.

== See also ==
- Insects as food
- List of soups
