= HMS Cockchafer =

Four ships of the Royal Navy have borne the name HMS Cockchafer after the insect, the cockchafer:

- HMS Cockchafer (1812), of five guns, was formerly the United States schooner Spencer, that the Royal Navy captured and employed as a ship's tender. She captured two American armed brigs, one in a single-ship action. The Royal Navy sold her in 1815.
- HMS Cockchafer (1855) was an Albacore-class wooden screw gunboat launched in 1855 and sold in 1872.
- HMS Cockchafer (1881) was a Banterer-class composite screw gunboat launched in 1881 and sold in 1905.
- HMS Cockchafer (1915) was an Insect-class gunboat launched in 1915, hulked in 1947 and sold in 1949.

== See also ==
- HM hired armed lugger Cockchafer was an 8-gun lugger hired in 1794 that foundered in 1801.
