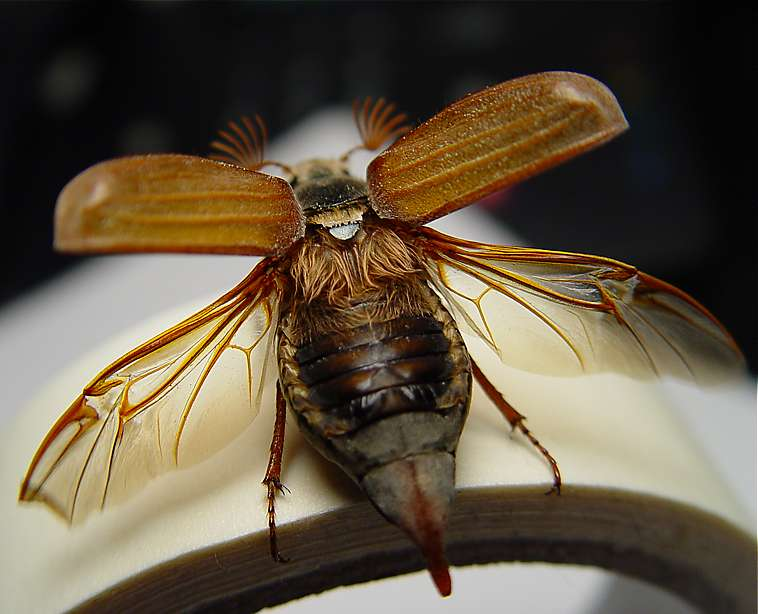
- A cockchafer (Melolontha melolontha) at take-off

Scientific classification
- Kingdom: Animalia
- Phylum: Arthropoda
- Clade: Pancrustacea
- Class: Insecta
- Order: Coleoptera
- Suborder: Polyphaga
- Infraorder: Scarabaeiformia
- Family: Scarabaeidae
- Tribe: Melolonthini
- Genus: Melolontha; Fabricius, 1775

Species
- Many, see text

Synonyms
- Melolontha (Apropyga) Medvedev, 1951; Ludibrius Gozis, 1886; Hoplosternus Blanchard, 1851; Hoplosternus Guérin-Méneville, 1838; Oplosternus Guérin-Méneville, 1838

= Melolontha =

Genus of beetles

Melolontha is a genus of beetles in the family Scarabaeidae. The European cockchafers belong to this genus.

== Taxonomy ==
Linnaeus called the European cockchafer Scarabaeus melolontha. Étienne Louis Geoffroy used Melolontha as a genus name (1762), but his book has been suppressed by the International Commission of Zoological Nomenclature, and the authority for the name is the later (1775) publication by Johan Christian Fabricius.

== Species ==
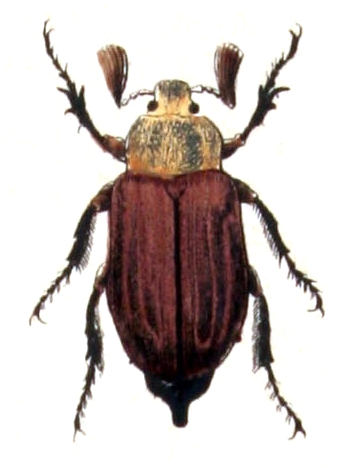
M. hippocastani

The following is a list of species within the genus Melolontha:

- Melolontha aceris Faldermann, 1836
- Melolontha aeneicollis Bates, 1891
- Melolontha afflicta Ballion, 1871
- Melolontha albida Frivaldszky, 1835
- Melolontha albopruinosa Fairmaire, 1878
- Melolontha anita Reitter, 1902
- Melolontha arunachalensis Gupta, Keith, Bhunia, Das, Ghosh & Chandra, 2023
- Melolontha baetica Hillert, Rössner, Navarro & Urbano, 2019
- Melolontha borumandi Montreuil, 2012
- Melolontha carinata (Brenske, 1896)
- Melolontha chinensis Guérin-Méneville, 1838
- Melolontha ciliciensis Petrovitz, 1962
- Melolontha costipennis Fairmaire, 1889
- Melolontha cuprescens Blanchard, 1871
- Melolontha daliensis Wang & Qiu, 2025
- Melolontha davidis Fairmaire, 1878
- Melolontha excisicauda Balthasar, 1936
- Melolontha flabellata Sharp, 1876
- Melolontha frater Arrow, 1913 – Indonesia
- Melolontha furcicauda Ancey, 1881
- Melolontha gonzalezi López-Colón & Bahillo De la Puebla, 2020
- Melolontha gussakovskii Medvedev, 1945
- Melolontha guttigera Sharp, 1876
- Melolontha hidalgoi Hillert, Rössner, Navarro & Urbano, 2019
- Melolontha hippocastani Fabricius, 1801 – European forest cockchafer
- Melolontha hybrida Charpentier, 1825
- Melolontha incana (Motschulsky, 1853)
- Melolontha indica Hope, 1831
- Melolontha insulana (Moser, 1918)
- Melolontha japonica Burmeister, 1855
- Melolontha javanica Keith & Li, 2005
- Melolontha jianbini Wang, 2024
- Melolontha lachungensis Gupta, Keith, Bhunia, Das, Ghosh & Chandra, 2023
- Melolontha linaresi Hillert, Rössner, Navarro & Urbano, 2019
- Melolontha macrophylla Fischer von Waldheim, 1830
- Melolontha maculata (Zhang, 1983)
- Melolontha malaccensis (Moser, 1913)
- Melolontha mandarina Fairmaire, 1878
- Melolontha masafumii Nomura, 1952
- Melolontha medvedevi Kryzhanovskij, 1978
- Melolontha melolontha (Linnaeus, 1758) – common European cockchafer
- Melolontha minima Kobayashi, 1985
- Melolontha nepalensis (Blanchard, 1851)
- Melolontha opaca Billberg, 1820
- Melolontha papposa Illiger, 1803
- Melolontha pectoralis Megerle von Mühlfeld, 1812 – European large cockchafer
- Melolontha permira Reitter, 1887
- Melolontha phupanensis Keith, 2008
- Melolontha pinguis Walker, 1859
- Melolontha pseudofurcicauda Keith, 2008
- Melolontha reichenbachi Keith, 2008
- Melolontha rufocrassa Fairmaire, 1889
- Melolontha sabatinellii Rössner & Hillert, 2020
- Melolontha sardiniensis Drumont, Muret, Hager & Penner, 1999
- Melolontha satsumaensis Niijima & Kinoshita, 1923
- Melolontha sculpticollis Fairmaire, 1891
- Melolontha setifera Li, 2010
- Melolontha shanghaiana (Brenske, 1896)
- Melolontha siamensis Nonfried, 1891
- Melolontha taihokuensis Niijima & Kinoshita, 1923
- Melolontha tamina Nomura, 1964
- Melolontha tarimensis Semenov, 1896
- Melolontha taygetana Rey, 1999
- Melolontha tenuicauda Fairmaire, 1896
- Melolontha tianlongi Wang, 2024
- Melolontha virescens (Brenske, 1896)
- Melolontha wangyutangi Wang & Qiu, 2025
- Melolontha weyersi (Brenske, 1900)
- Melolontha wushana Nomura, 1977
- Melolontha xui Wang, 2024

== Fossil species ==
- †Melolontha greithiana Heer, 1847
- †Melolontha solitaria Novak, 1878

== Selected former species ==
- Melolontha argus Burmeister 1855
- Melolontha bifurcata (Brenske, 1896)
- Melolontha fuscotestacea Kraatz, 1887
- Melolontha kraatzi Reitter 1906
- Melolontha rubiginosa
