= Karl von Moll =

Austrian naturalist and statesman

Karl Maria E(h)renbert Freiherr von Moll (21 December 1760, in Thalgau – 1 February 1838, in Augsburg) was an Austrian naturalist and statesman.

From 1790 to 1804 he served as chancellor of the exchequer for Salzburg, afterwards residing in Munich and Augsburg, where he devoted his energies to natural history. In 1807 he became a member of the Academie der Wissenschaften in Munich, where up until 1827, he served as secretary in the class of mathematics and physics.

During his career he amassed a library of 80,000 books, including many rare volumes on natural history. He also owned a diverse collection of zoological specimens, a significant herbarium in which Alpine flora was well represented, and an impressive mineral collection, of which, a portion was bought by the British Museum.

The moss genus Mollia (Schrank ex Lindb, 1878) from the family Pottiaceae is named after him. Also in 1826, botanist Carl Friedrich Philipp von Martius published Mollia, a genus of flowering plants from South America, belonging to the family Malvaceae and also named in honour of Karl von Moll.

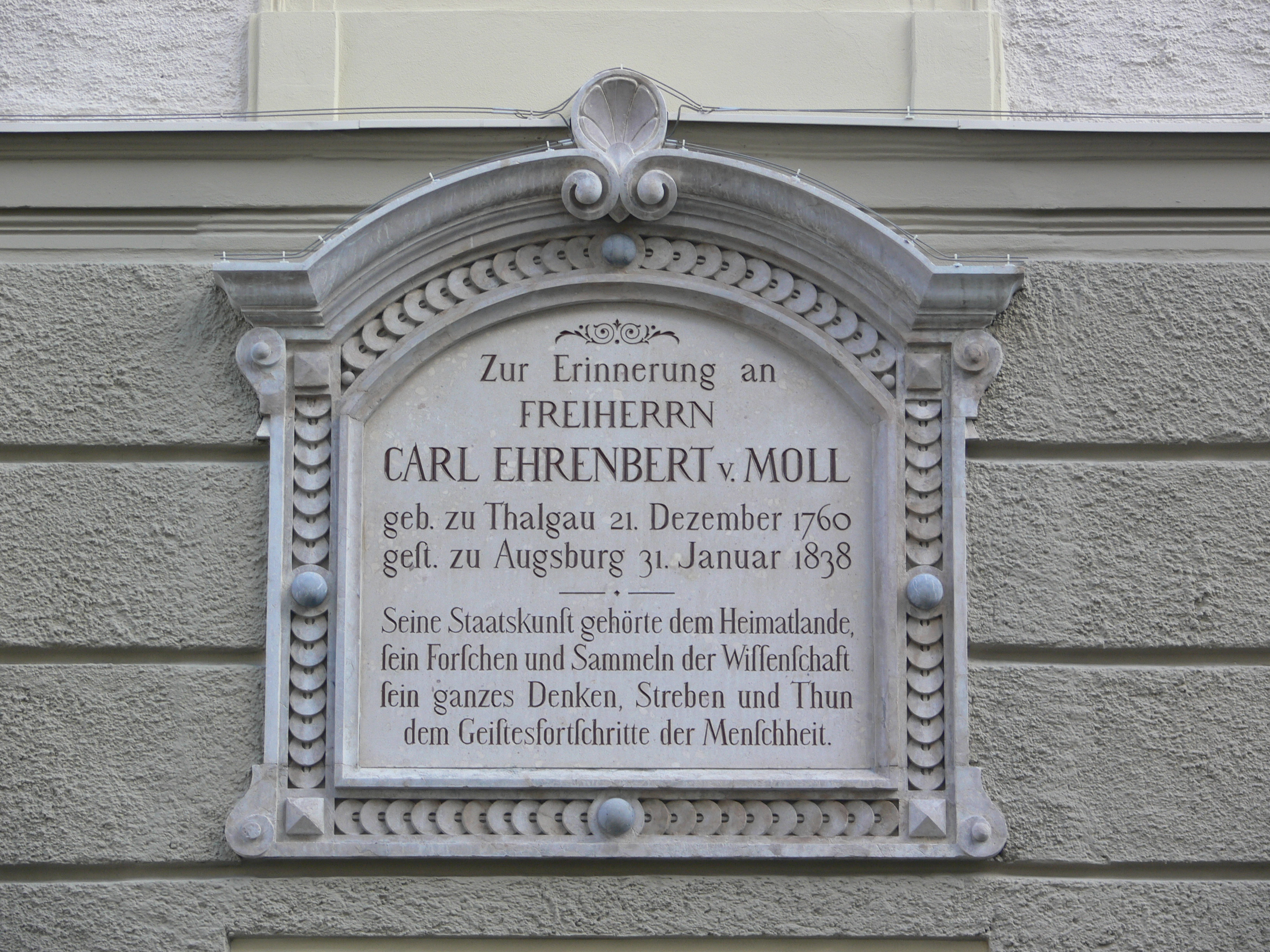
Memorial plaque of Karl von Moll on Universitätsplatz, Salzburg

== Works ==
- With Franz von Paula Schrank: Naturhistorischen Briefe über Oesterreich, Salzburg, Passau und Berchtesgaden, 2 Bde 1785.
- Oberdeutsche Beiträge zur Naturlehre und Oeconomie für das Jahr 1787 (Hsg.)
- With Antonio Canestrini: Historia de utero duplici, alterutro quarto graviditatis mense rupto 1788 (Hsg.)
- Fortgesetzte Müllenkampfsche Sammlung der Forstordnungen verschiedener Länder, 1796 (Hsg).
- Des Freiherrn K.E. von Moll Mittheilungen aus seinem Briefwechsel als Prodromus seiner Selbstbiographie, (1829–1835).
