= Franz von Paula Schrank =

German biologist (1747–1835)

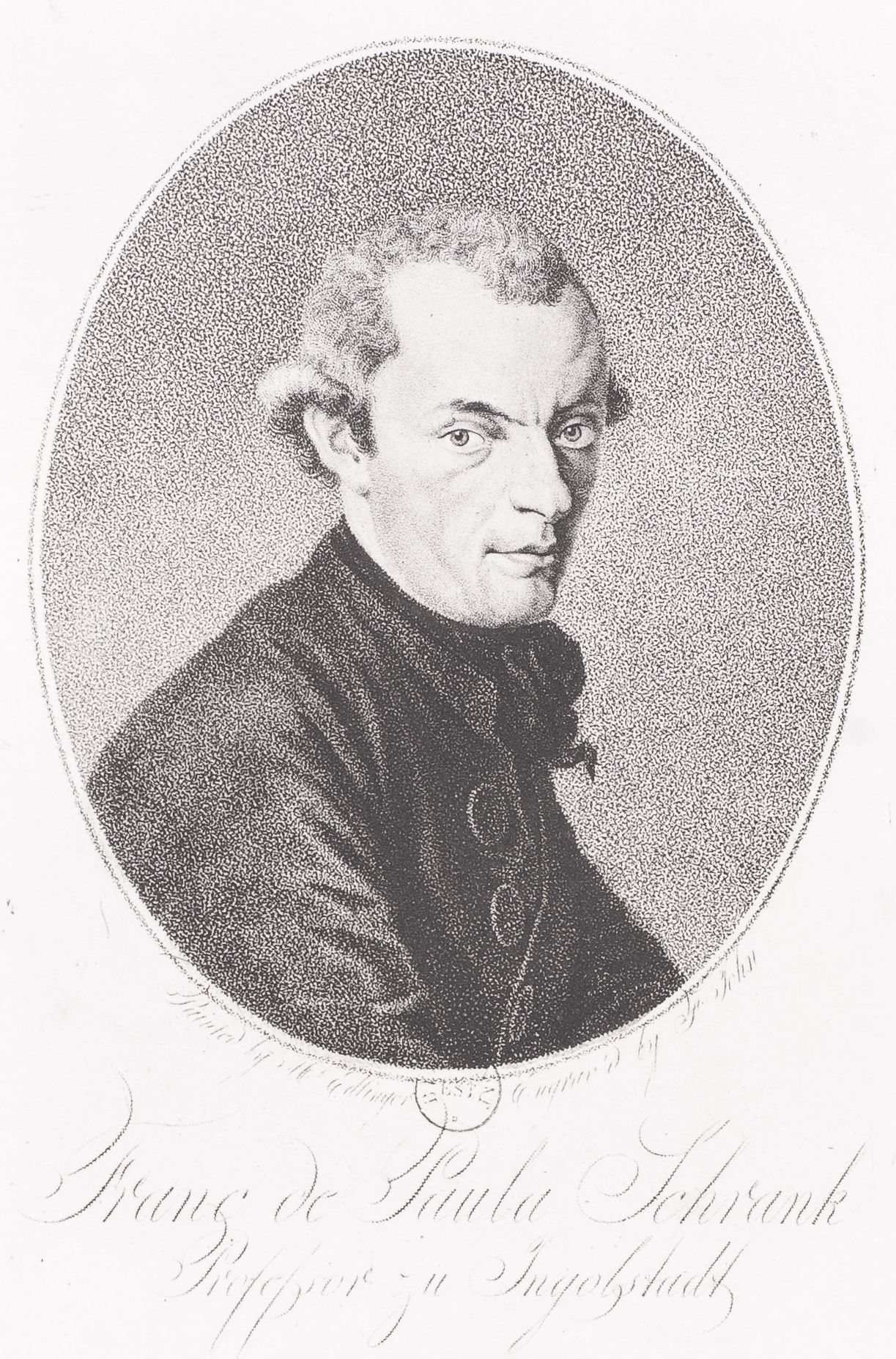
Franz von Paula Schrank.

Franz von Paula Schrank (21 August 1747, in Vornbach – 22 December 1835) was a German priest, botanist and entomologist. He served as a professor of agriculture and auxiliary sciences at the University of Ingolstadt from 1784.

== Biography ==
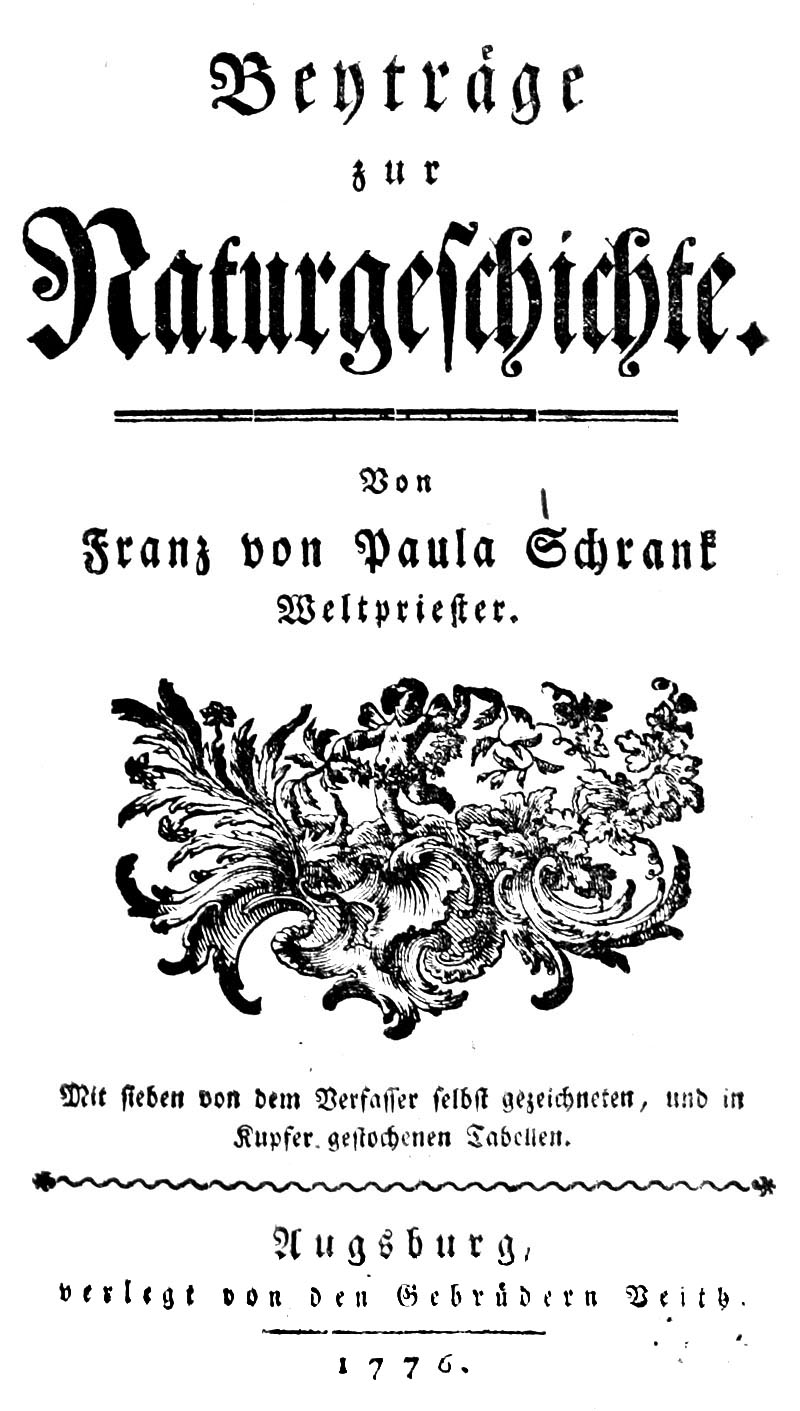
Beyträge zur Naturgeschichte.

Schrank was born in Vornbach, the son of a Passau lawyer who worked as a monastery judge in Vornbach. He received a Jesuit education in Raab, Tyrnau and Vienna after which he taught for some time in secondary schools, for sometime under Ignaz Schiffermüller and looked after the Linz botanical garden. From 1772 he lived in Burghausen. He received a doctorate in theology from Vienna in 1776. He was ordained as a priest in Vienna in 1784. In 1786 he was named chair of mathematics and physics at the lyceum in Amberg, and in 1784 became a professor of botany and zoology at the University of Ingolstadt (later removed to Landshut). Schrank was the first director of the botanical gardens in Munich from 1809 to 1832. He taught on natural history, botany, mining and forestry.

Schrank was the first author to use the genus name Triops, which he used in his work on the fauna of Bavaria in 1803. He was against the idea of growing Robinia trees as a source of firewood which was promoted by Friedrich Casimir Medicus.

Schrank was made extraordinary member of the Bavarian Academy of Sciences in 1778 and 1779 and was a director of the Burghausen Moral-Economic Society. In 1809 he became an ordinary member of the Bavarian Academy of Sciences and was also a founder of the Bavarian Agricultural Association.

== Works ==
- Beiträge zur Naturgeschichte (Augsburg, 1776)
- Vorlesungen über die Art die Naturgeschichte zu studieren (Ratisbohn, 1780)
- Enumeratio insectorum Austriæ indigenorum (Wien, 1781)
- Anleitung die Naturgeschichte zu studieren (München, 1783)
- Naturhistorische Briefe über Österreich, Salzburg, Passau und Berchtesgaden with Karl Maria Erenbert Freiherr von Moll, Salzburg, 1784–1785)
- Anfangsgründe der Botanik (München, 1785)
- Baiersche Reise … (1786)
- Verzeichnis der bisher hinlänglich bekannten Eingeweidewürmer, nebst einer Abhandlungen über ihre Anverwandschaften (München, 1787)
- Bayerische Flora (München, 1789)
- Primitiæ floræ salisburgensis, cum dissertatione prævia de discrimine plantarum ab animalibus (Frankfurt, 1792)
- Abhandlungen einer Privatgesellschaft vom Naturforschern und Ökonomen in Oberteutschland (München, 1792)
- Anfangsgründe der Bergwerkskunde (Ingolstadt, 1793)
- Reise nach den südlichen Gebirgen von Bayern, in Hinsicht auf botanische und ökonomische Gegenstände (München, 1793)
- Fauna Boica Vol 1 (Nürnberg, 1798)
- Fauna Boica Vol 2 (Ingolstadt, 1801)
- Fauna Boica Vol 3 (Nürnberg, 1803)
- Flora monacensis (München, 1811–1820)
- Plantæ rariores horti academici Monacensis descriptæ et iconibus illustratæ (1819)
- Sammlung von Zierpflanzen (1819)
- Entomologische Beobachtungen Naturforscher Stück 24, 60–90. (1789)
- Enumeratio insectorum Austriae indigenorum Francisci de Paula Schrank. Augustae Vindelicorum : Klett et Franck, 1781. 548 pp. (1781) (checklist)
- Sammlung naturhistorischer und physikalischer Aufsäze, hrsg. von Franz von Paula Schrank. Nürnberg, Raspe, 1796. xvi, 456 p. 7 plates (part fold.) online

== See also ==
- Category:Taxa named by Franz von Paula Schrank
- List of Roman Catholic scientist-clerics
