= June beetle =

June beetle is the common name for several scarab beetles that appear around June in temperate parts of North America:

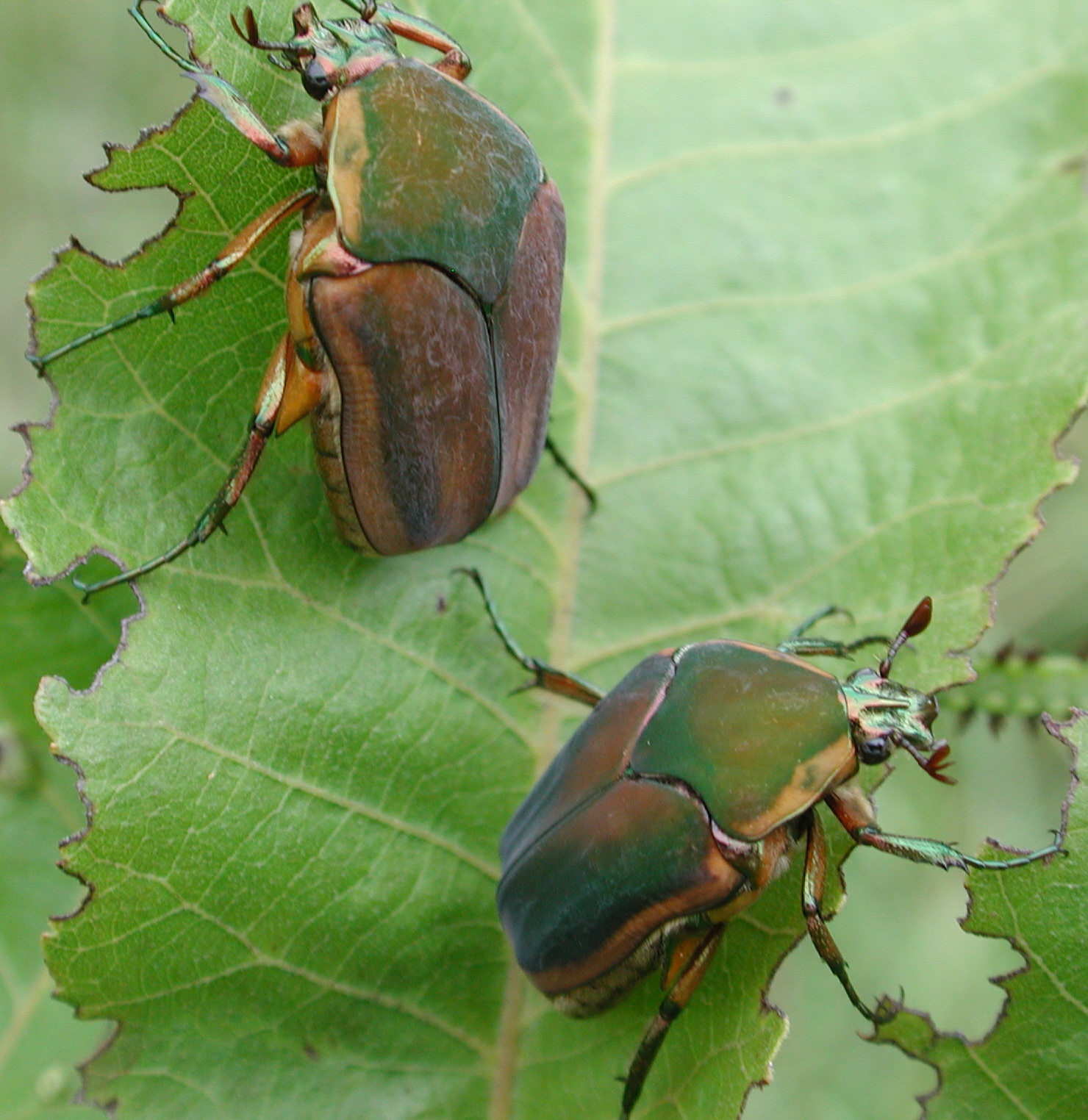
Cotinis nitida

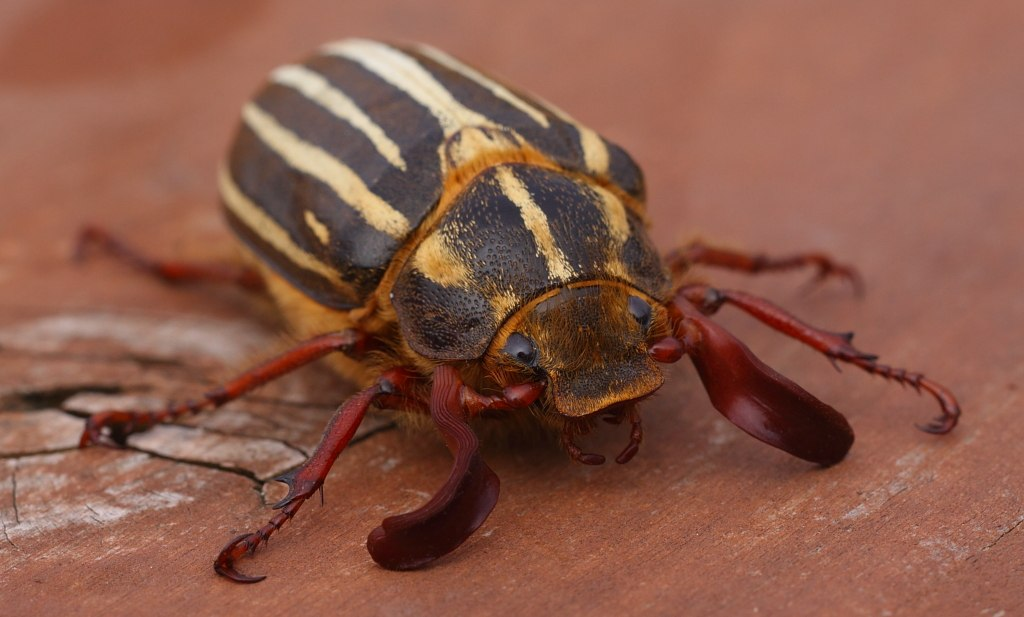
Polyphylla decemlineata

In subfamily Cetoniinae:

- Cotinis nitida (Green June beetle) of the southeastern United States
- Cotinis mutabilis (Figeater beetle) of the western and southwestern United States

In subfamily Melolonthinae:

- Amphimallon solstitiale (European June beetle, summer chafer) of Europe (and other species of Amphimallon )
- Melolontha (cockchafers or May bugs) of Europe
- Phyllophaga (May beetles) of the Americas
- Polyphylla decemlineata (Ten-lined June beetle) of the western United States and Canada.
- Rhizotrogus marginipes (and other species of Rhizotrogus )

== See also ==
- June bug (disambiguation)
