= Basilica Block Party =

Annual music festival in Minneapolis

- 2008 Logo
- Genre: Rock, pop
- Dates: 02–03 August 2024 (most recently)
- Location: United States: Minneapolis (1995–2019, 2021, 2024)
- Years active: 1995–2019, 2021, 2024
- Organiser: Basilica of Saint Mary, Cities 97
- Website: basilicablockparty.org

The Basilica Block Party was an annual two-day music festival that took place in Minneapolis, Minnesota. The event was hosted by the Basilica of St. Mary and described by City Pages as "summertime's hottest church party". The festival was the largest music festival held within the city of Minneapolis.

The event spanned three decades, with headlining artists including Ryan Adams, Weezer, Imagine Dragons, Ray LaMontagne, Panic! at the Disco, Trampled by Turtles, Spoon, Ziggy Marley and The Wallflowers.

The party was an ongoing fundraiser to help pay for the structural restoration of the Basilica.

== History ==
The event served to raise money toward the ongoing restoration of the Basilica of St. Mary. In the event's 24th year, it drew approximately 25,000 attendees to downtown Minneapolis.

The event "started off with controversy" in 1995, according to The Star Tribune, as "people questioned using beer and rock music to raise money for a historic Catholic church." It began as a fundraiser to pay for a $9.5 million structural restoration of the Basilica of St Mary, the first basilica established in the United States of America. Five percent of the proceeds from the event go toward the St. Vincent de Paul outreach program, which provides services to those in need.

In its opening year, it drew more than 15,000 people, raising over $100,000.

In 1995, the majority of the bands were local. Since then, the roster has evolved, with past performers including Semisonic, The Wallflowers, The Avett Brothers, Weezer, AWOLNATION, and Ryan Adams.

Due to the COVID-19 pandemic in Minnesota the block party was cancelled in 2020. The 2021 event happened on September 10–11. The 2021 event required either a negative COVID test or proof of vaccination. Shortly before the event, scheduled headliners, the Avett Brothers were forced to withdraw because of exposure to COVID. Attendance for the 2021 event was roughly half of a typical successful event for the Basilica Block Party. It was cancelled in 2022 and 2023.

On February 15, 2024, it was announced the event would come back for the summer of 2024. Due to construction nearby on the festival's typical grounds at the Basilica of Saint Mary, the festival was instead hosted at Boom Island Park in 2024. Boom Island Park is a larger space than the Basilica's usual ground and organizers are considering using Boom Island Park for future Basilica Block Parties.

in 2026, it was announced that the event would no longer be held, with 2024 being the last year.

== Lineups ==
=== 2019 ===
==== Friday July 12 ====
- Kacey Musgraves
- Semisonic
- Dawes
- The Jayhawks
- Anderson East
- Ruston Kelly
- Yam Haus
- Kiss The Tiger
- Annie Mack
- McNasty Brass Band

==== Saturday July 13 ====
- Flora Cash
- Jason Mraz
- CHVRCHES
- Hanson
- Metric
- Johnnyswim
- Lissie
- Michael Shynes
- The Bad Man
- Static Panic

=== 2018 ===
==== Friday July 6 ====
- Jason Isbell & The 400 Unit
- Fitz and the Tantrums
- John Butler Trio
- The Revolution
- Delta Rae
- Now, Now
- TABAH
- Lena Elizabeth
- Kid Dakota
- LadyLark

==== Saturday July 7 ====
- CAKE
- Andy Grammer
- BORNS
- Judah & the Lion
- Third Eye Blind
- Early Eyes
- Flint Eastwood
- Lazy Scorsese
- The Shackletons
- Reina del Cid

=== 2017 ===
==== Friday July 7 ====
- Brandi Carlile
- The Shins
- Andrew McMahon in the Wilderness
- Needtobreathe
- Cobi
- John Paul White
- The Roosevelts
- Nick Jordan
- Jaedyn James & The Hunger
- Night Moves

==== Saturday July 8 ====
- WALK THE MOON
- AWOLNATION
- Gavin DeGraw
- Ben Rector
- Walk Off the Earth
- Julia Brennan
- Enemy Planes
- Nook Jones
- Jackson & The Roosters
- J.S. Ondara

=== 2016 ===
==== Friday July 8 ====
- Death Cab for Cutie
- Gary Clark Jr.
- American Authors
- Cold War Kids
- X Ambassadors
- Andra Day
- Gospel Machine
- Fort Wilson Riot

==== Saturday July 9 ====
- The Fray
- Ryan Adams & The Shinning
- Phillip Phillips
- Milky Chance
- Matt Nathanson
- Craig Fin
- Ron Pope
- Eric Mayson
- Holiday
- Farewell Milwaukee

=== 2015 ===
==== Friday July 10 ====
- Weezer
- O.A.R
- Nate Ruess of Fun.
- Mat Kearney
- Motion City Soundtrack
- Matthew Sweet
- Zoo Animal
- Rupert Angeleyes
- TYTE JEFF

==== Saturday July 11 ====
- Wilco
- Fitz and the Tantrums
- Jason Isbell
- Echosmith
- Rachel Platten
- Jenny Lewis
- Fly Golden Eagle
- Aero Flynn
- Southside Desire
- American Scarecrows

=== 2014 ===
==== Friday, July 11 ====
- Edward Sharpe & the Magnetic Zeros
- Michael Franti & Spearhead
- Panic! at the Disco
- Delta Rae
- Eric Hutchinson
- Crash
- The Weeks
- Black Diet
- Carroll
- Sterol Confessions
- Black Diet

==== Saturday July 12 ====
- Train
- Ben Harper & Charlie Musselwhite
- Ingrid Michaelson
- The Wild Feathers
- Caroline Smith
- Alpha Rev
- Serena Ryder
- Jillian Rae
- BBGUN

=== 2013 ===
==== Friday July 12 ====
- Grace Potter & The Nocturnals
- Matt Nathanson
- Father John Misty
- ZZ Ward
- Mayer Hawthorne
- Family of the Year
- Churchill
- Actual Wlf
- The Cactus Blossoms
- Southwire

==== Saturday July 13 ====
- Matchbox Twenty
- Sharon Jones & The Dap Kings
- Goo Goo Dolls
- Walk the Moon
- Cloud Cult
- Kate Earl
- additional local bands

=== 2012 ===
==== Friday, July 6 ====
- Train
- Cake
- The Head and the Heart
- Imagine Dragons
- Mat Kearney
- Tyrone Wells
- additional local artists

==== Saturday, July 7 ====
- The Avett Brothers
- O.A.R
- Fitz and the Tantrums
- Graffiti6
- The Lumineers
- Stuart D'Rozario
- additional local artists

=== 2011 ===
- The Jayhawks
- David Gray
- Ray LaMontagne
- Lissie

=== 2010 ===
- Weezer
- Spoon
- Barenaked Ladies
- Grace Potter and the Nocturnals

=== 2009 ===
- Junebug
- Mat Kearney
- Romantica
- The Black Crowes
- The Jayhawks
- Counting Crows
- Tapes 'n Tapes
- The Hold Steady

=== 2008 ===
==== Friday, July 11 ====
- Dave Barnes
- Augustana
- OneRepublic
- Wannabe Hasbeens
- Needtobreathe
- Ziggy Marley

==== Saturday, July 12 ====
- White Light Riot
- Test Your Reflex
- Missy Higgins
- Gavin Rossdale
- Grayson
- Landon Pigg
- Gin Blossoms

=== 2007 ===
==== Friday, July 6 ====
- The Alarmists
- Lifehouse
- Amos Lee
- The Great Physician
- The Cat Empire
- Robert Randolph and the Family Band

==== Saturday, July 7 ====
- The Sweet Colleens
- Brandi Carlile
- Jonny Lang
- 2 Wurds
- Plain White T's
- G. Love & Special Sauce

=== 2006 ===
==== Friday, July 7 ====
- Trampled by Turtles
- The Fray
- Guster
- Wannabe Hasbeens
- The Hopefuls
- Mike Doughty

==== Saturday, July 8 ====
- Mat Kearney
- Aqualung
- Train
- Nathan Anderson
- Animal Liberation Orchestra
- Freddy Jones Band

=== 2005 ===
==== Friday, July 8 ====
- Tagine
- Big Head Todd and the Monsters
- Gear Daddies
- Summit Ave
- Blue Merle
- Pete Yorn

==== Saturday, July 9 ====
- Olympic Hopefuls
- Carbon Leaf
- The Wallflowers
- Holiday
- Marc Broussard
- Better Than Ezra

=== 2004 ===
==== Friday, July 9 ====
- Wheat
- Joe Firstman
- Counting Crows
- The Humans
- The Honeydogs
- O.A.R.

==== Saturday, July 10 ====
- Great Big Sea
- Pat McGee Band
- Five for Fighting
- Kalgren
- Dan Wilson
- Shawn Mullins

=== 2003 ===
==== Friday, July 11 ====
- Freddy Perez
- Edwin McCain
- The Suburbs
- Panaramic Blue
- The Thorns
- Nickel Creek

==== Saturday, July 12 ====
- Kathleen Edwards
- The Suburbs
- Train
- G.B. Leighton
- Alice Peacock
- The Jayhawks

=== 2002 ===
==== Friday, July 12 ====
- Tim Mahoney
- Dishwalla
- Big Head Todd and the Monsters
- The Honeydogs
- Midnight Oil
- Soul Asylum

==== Saturday, July 13 ====
- Seven Mary Three
- Spin Doctors
- Gin Blossoms
- Phantom Planet
- Neil Finn
- Sister Hazel
