= Asynchronous muscles =

Type of muscle

Asynchronous muscles are muscles in which there is no one-to-one relationship between electrical stimulation and mechanical contraction. The majority of flying insects use asynchronous muscles to generate wingbeat frequencies faster than what most neuromuscular systems can sustain. Insects that use asynchronous muscles evolved from synchronous ancestors ~400 million years ago (despite previous reports of 7–10 independent events). Unlike synchronous muscles that contract once per neural signal, asynchronous muscles can be triggered through mechanical oscillations. The rate of mechanical contraction of asynchronous muscles can reach an order of magnitude faster than electrical signals. Although they achieve greater force output and higher efficiency at high frequencies, they have limited applications because of their dependence on mechanical stretch.

== Structure ==
=== Molecular ===
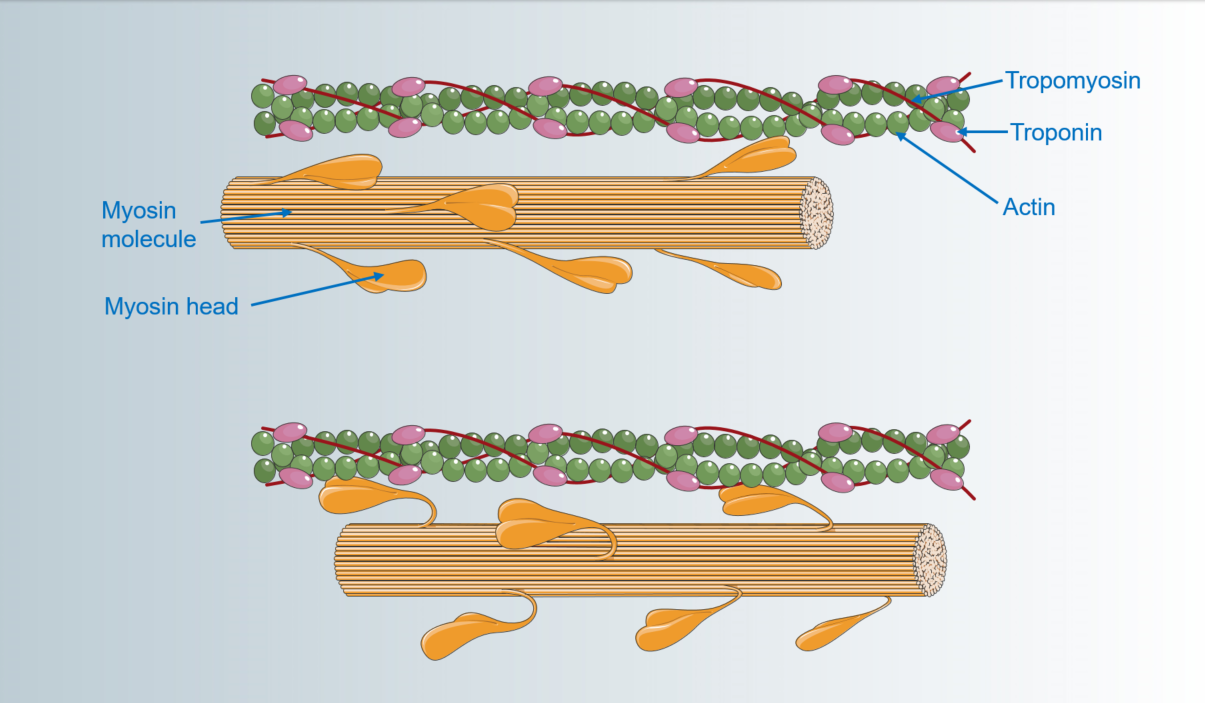
Molecular components of myofibrils. Muscle can only contract when actin binding sites are revealed for myosin heads to attach. Created by Servier Medical Art and used under a Creative Commons Attribution 3.0 Unported License.

The exact molecular mechanisms used by asynchronous muscles are unknown, but it is believed that asynchronous muscles have no unique molecular structures as compared to their synchronous counterparts. A study investigating the asynchronous power muscles in bumblebees with X-ray diffraction videos showed that actin and myosin alone are sufficient for generating asynchronous behavior. This finding helps explain how asynchronous muscles independently evolved across insect taxa. More recent work using similar X-ray diffraction techniques in Lethocerus discovered that troponin bridges may play a critical role in stretch activation. As the muscle is stretched, these bridges move tropomyosin to reveal myosin–actin binding sites. The muscle can only produce force when these sites are activated.

=== Macroscopic ===
Several changes to asynchronous muscles' macroscopic structure provide it with high force production and efficiency at high contraction frequencies. A critical adaptation is that asynchronous muscles maintain a tonic level of calcium instead of cycling calcium between contractions. This is evident in their long twitch duration. This is due to relatively spare sarcoplasmic reticulum. Because of requirements for high force production, myofiber and myofibril diameters are increased and the large amount of ATP necessary leads to high mitochondria densities. In Cotinus mutabilis, asynchronous muscles are composed of 58.1% myofibril, 36.7% mitochondria, and 1.6% sarcoplasmic reticulum. In comparison, synchronous muscles in Schistocerca americana are composed of 65% myofibril, 23.5% mitochondria and 9.6% sarcoplasmic reticulum. Although synchronous muscle has a higher percentage of myofibril, the cross-sectional area of asynchronous myofibril is 3.7 μm^{2} as opposed to 0.82 μm^{2} in synchronous muscle for the previously described species.

== Properties ==
=== Asynchrony between electrical stimulation and muscle contraction ===
The defining characteristic of asynchronous muscles is that there is no direct relationship between neural activation and muscle contraction. Typically, the number of muscle contractions is an order of magnitude greater than the number of action potentials sent to the muscle. Instead of directly controlling force generation, neural signals maintain [Ca^{2+}] above a threshold for stretch-activation to occur. For asynchronous muscles, neural inputs are typically thought of as an "on-off" switch while mechanical stimulus leads to individual muscle contractions. However, recent studies using genetically engineered Drosophila revealed correlations between [Ca^{2+}] and force production. Further work has shown bilateral calcium asymmetries in Drosophila. These results indicate that there is some level of neural control beyond a simple "on" or "off" state.

=== Delayed stretch activation and delayed shortening deactivation ===
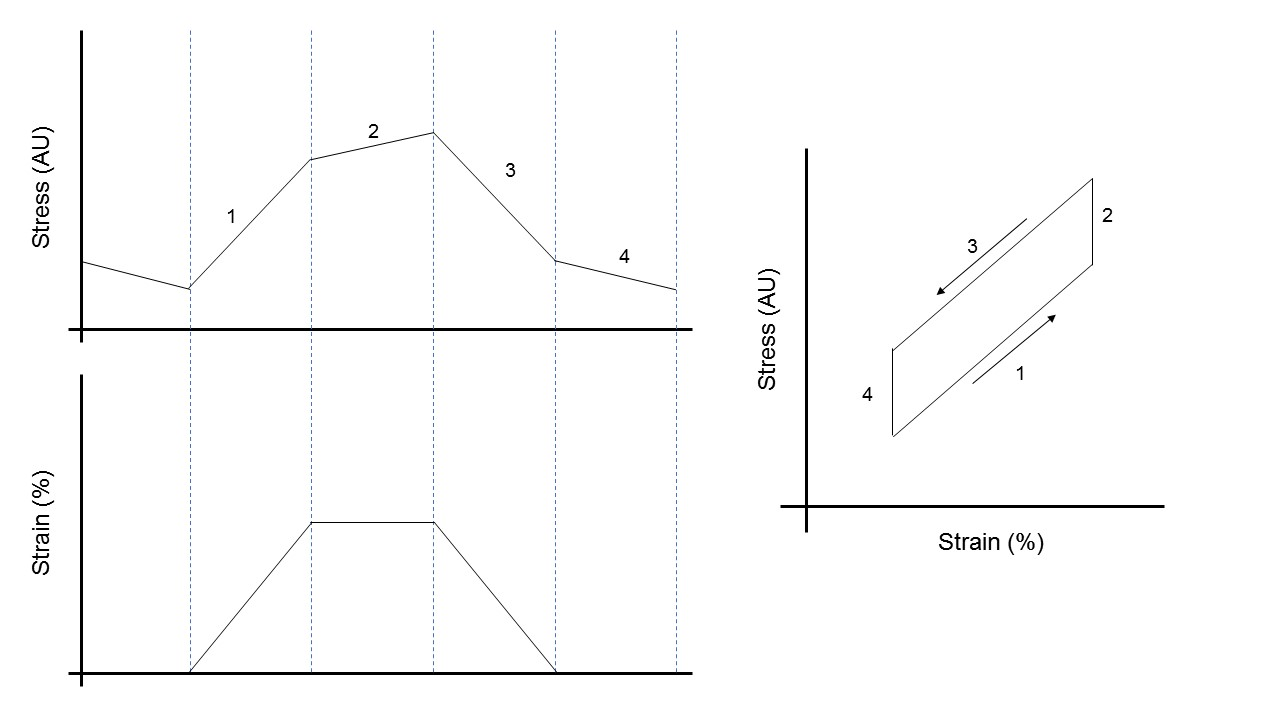
Left: stress produced by asynchronous muscle under a stretch-hold-release-hold experiment. Right: stress-strain plot showing positive work production. The work generated is equal to the area enclosed by the work loop. Adapted from Josephson, Malamud & Stokes 2000.

Delayed stretch activation and delayed shortening deactivation allow asynchronous muscles to generate positive work under cyclic oscillations. When the muscle shortens, force drops and continues dropping even when the muscle length remains constant. Similarly, when the muscle lengthens, force increases and continues increasing after the muscle length remains constant. Because of these delays, the work produced by the muscle during shortening is greater than the work absorbed during lengthening, therefore producing positive work. In contrast, synchronous muscles absorb work under similar conditions. Both types of muscles consume ATP to drive force production and produce work.

=== Long twitch duration ===
Long twitch duration is a functional consequence of the macroscopic properties of asynchronous muscle. Because asynchronous muscle can generate power without cycling calcium between contractions, the required rate of calcium regulation is significantly slower. In addition to the reduction in sarcoplasmic reticulum, relatively large myofibril diameters lead to increased diffusion times of Ca^{2+}.Under isometric twitch experiments, asynchronous muscle in Cotinus mutabilis were found to have a twitch duration of 125 ms. In the same study, synchronous muscle in Schistocerca americana had a twitch duration of 40 ms. Therefore, asynchronous muscles respond slowly to neural stimulus. In the case of insect flight, electrical stimulation alone is too slow for muscle control. For Cotinus mutabilis, the twitch duration is ten times as long as a wingbeat period.

== Functional significance ==
=== Resonant properties ===
Asynchronous muscles produce work when they undergo mechanical oscillations provided there is sufficient Ca^{2+}. This can be achieved in one of two ways. First, two antagonistic muscles can be configured with elastic structures such that the contraction of one muscle stretches the other, causing it to activate and vice versa. This configuration is found in the power muscles of flying insects. Second, a single asynchronous muscle can deform an elastic element which then stretches the muscle and causes the muscle to contract again. This setup is used by Drosophila to oscillate mechanosensory organs known as halteres. As long as neural stimulus turn the muscles "on", both systems will continue to oscillate. These systems can be thought of as resonant systems, for which the oscillation frequency is dependent on the elasticity, damping, and force applied to the system.

In a simplified case, this can be thought of as a linearly damped harmonic oscillator, for which the damped resonant frequency is

$$\omega = \sqrt{\bigg(\frac{k}{m}\bigg)(1 - \zeta^2)}.$$

The damping ratio, ζ , is dependent on c, the damping coefficient, m, the mass of the system, and k, the stiffness of the system as shown

$$\zeta = \frac{c}{2 \sqrt{mk}}.$$

=== Power-control tradeoffs ===
Asynchronous muscles sacrifice neural control and flexibility in exchange for high force production and efficiency. Given the long twitch duration of asynchronous muscle, neural control is too slow to power flight. For instance, the asynchronous muscles in Cotinus mutabilis contract ten times faster than expected given their twitch duration. Because these muscles rely on stretch activation, they must be configured such that they can be stretched by an external force. Furthermore, they are only useful when evolutionary pressures select for a muscle that reactively contracts against an imposed stretch. For example, in grasping tasks, it would be detrimental for antagonist muscles to spontaneously contract. Despite these disadvantages, asynchronous muscles are beneficial for high frequency oscillations. They are more efficient than synchronous muscles because they do not require costly calcium regulation. This allows for changes in their macroscopic structure for increased force production.

== Applications ==
Asynchronous muscles power flight in most insect species. a: Wings b: Wing joint c: Dorsoventral muscles power the upstroke d: Dorsolongitudinal muscles (DLM) power the downstroke. The DLMs are oriented out of the page.

=== Insect flight ===
Miniaturization of insects leads to high wingbeat frequencies with midges reaching wingbeat frequencies of 1000 Hz. Because of their high force production and efficiency, asynchronous muscles are used to power insect flight in 75% of species. These insects possess two pairs of antagonistic asynchronous muscles that produce the majority of the power required for flight. These muscles are oriented such that as one pair contracts, it deforms the thorax and stretches the other pair, causing the second pair to contract. The same thoracic deformations oscillate the wings. By utilizing the elastic thorax to store and return energy during wing deceleration and subsequent acceleration, Drosophila is able to reduce energetic costs by 10%. This leads to a highly-efficient resonant system.

When wingbeat frequencies match the resonant frequency of the muscle-thorax system, flight is most efficient. In order to change wingbeat frequencies to avoid obstacles or generate more lift, insects use smaller "control" muscles such as the pleurosternal muscles to stiffen the thorax. From the equations in the Resonant properties section, it is clear that the natural frequency of the system increases with stiffness. Therefore, modulating the stiffness of the thorax leads to changes in wingbeat frequency.

=== Mammalian hearts ===
Although heart muscles are not strictly asynchronous, they exhibit delayed stretch activation properties. As cardiac muscle is lengthened, there is an instantaneous rise in force caused by elastic, spring-like elements in the muscle. After a time delay, the muscle generates a second rise in force, which is caused by delayed stretch activation as seen in purely asynchronous muscle. This property benefits heart function by maintaining papillary muscle tension during the entire systolic cycle well after the electrical wave has passed. Through stretch activation, the heart can rapidly adapt to changes in heart rates.

=== Cicadas ===
The tymbal muscles of cicadas are asynchronous. Tymbal muscles are found in the abdomen of male cicadas and used to produce sound. The muscles are attached to a ribbed piece of cuticle, so when the muscles contract, the tymbal cuticular membrane buckles producing a sound pulse. Some species of cicadas use aynchronous muscles, while other species use synchronous muscles.

=== Bioinspired robotics ===
Because of challenges arising from miniaturization such as poor scaling of electric motors, researchers have turned towards insects to develop centimeter-scale flying robots. Although the actuators in the RoboBee are not asynchronous, they use elastic elements to transmit forces from its "muscles" (piezoelectric actuators) to flap the wings. Similar to flying insects, they exploit resonance to improve efficiency by 50%.

== See also ==
- Insect flight
- Muscle contraction
- Thorax (insect anatomy)
