= Cotinis beraudi =

Scientific classification
- Domain: Eukaryota
- Kingdom: Animalia
- Phylum: Arthropoda
- Class: Insecta
- Order: Coleoptera
- Suborder: Polyphaga
- Infraorder: Scarabaeiformia
- Family: Scarabaeidae
- Genus: Cotinis
- Species: C. beraudi

Binomial name
- Cotinis beraudi Delgado, 1998

Species of beetle

Cotinis beraudi is a species of Cotinis scarab.
