= Cotinis aliena =

Keys green June beetle

Scientific classification
- Domain: Eukaryota
- Kingdom: Animalia
- Phylum: Arthropoda
- Class: Insecta
- Order: Coleoptera
- Suborder: Polyphaga
- Infraorder: Scarabaeiformia
- Family: Scarabaeidae
- Genus: Cotinis
- Species: C. aliena

Binomial name
- Cotinis aliena Woodruff, 2008

Species of beetle

Cotinis aliena (also Keys green June beetle) is a species of Cotinis found in the Florida Keys.

This species is considered to be critically imperiled because it is only known from three localities in the Florida Keys and one locality in southern peninsular Florida. No specimens have been found since 1998. Development and pesticides are the most likely threats to its survival.
