= Cotinis pauperula =

Scientific classification
- Kingdom: Animalia
- Phylum: Arthropoda
- Class: Insecta
- Order: Coleoptera
- Suborder: Polyphaga
- Infraorder: Scarabaeiformia
- Family: Scarabaeidae
- Genus: Cotinis
- Species: C. pauperula

Binomial name
- Cotinis pauperula Burmeister 1847

Species of beetle

Cotinis pauperula is a species of the Cotinis scarab genus.
