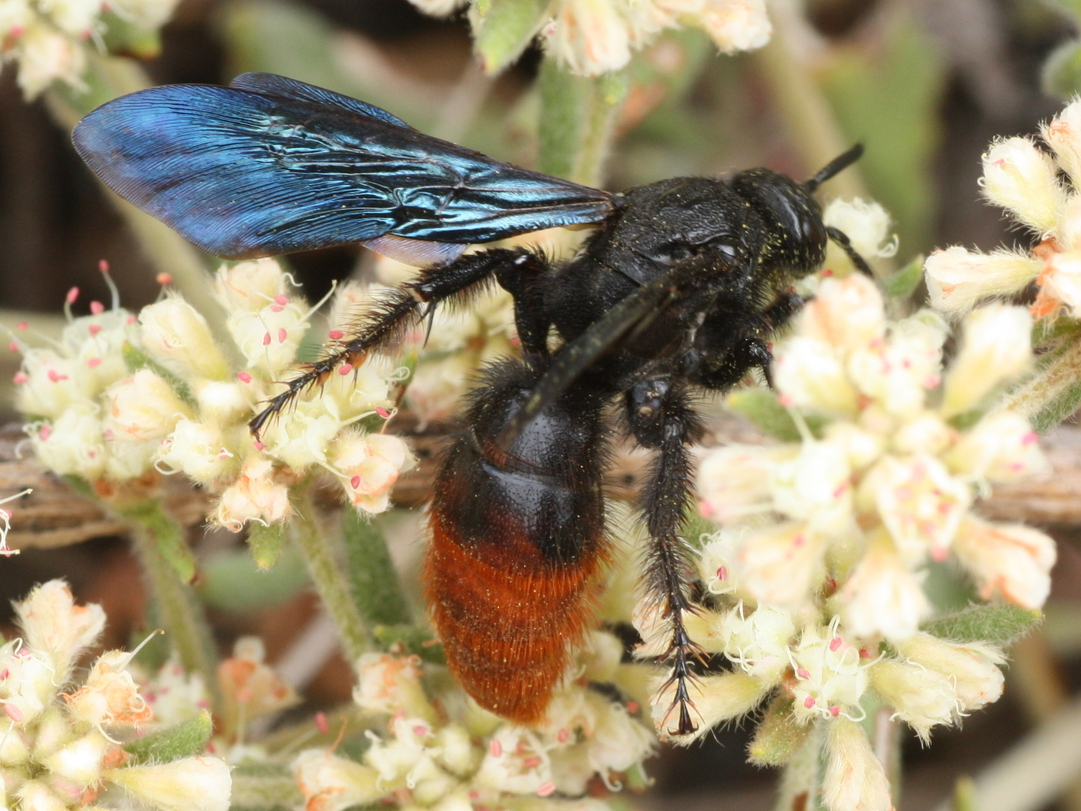

Scientific classification
- Kingdom: Animalia
- Phylum: Arthropoda
- Clade: Pancrustacea
- Class: Insecta
- Order: Hymenoptera
- Family: Scoliidae
- Genus: Triscolia
- Species: T. ardens

Binomial name
- Triscolia ardens (Smith, 1855)

Synonyms
- Scolia ardens Smith, 1855

= Triscolia ardens =

Species of wasp

Triscolia ardens is a species of wasp in the family Scoliidae. It is the sole member of its genus found in North America outside of Mexico.

== Description and identification ==
Among the North American fauna, this species is recognized as a Triscolia by the combination of a single recurrent vein and three submarginal cells. The integument and setae are black from the head to the second segment of the gaster but red on the remainder of the gaster. In terms of color, this species resembles the common Scolia dubia but lacks the distinctive yellow spots of the nominate subspecies. As with other scoliids, the females have short antennae, while the males have long antennae, and possess a "three pronged pseudosting".

== Distribution ==
T. ardens is known from the Mexican states of Querétaro, San Luis Potosí, and Sonora and from the United States from California to Texas.

== Habitat ==
Open fields, meadows, open areas in general, where they fly near to the ground, in search of prey.

== Behavior ==
This species will often burrow underground, find, sting, and lay eggs on a grub, and build a cell around it, covering up the hole.
