= Cotinis lebasi =

Scientific classification
- Domain: Eukaryota
- Kingdom: Animalia
- Phylum: Arthropoda
- Class: Insecta
- Order: Coleoptera
- Suborder: Polyphaga
- Infraorder: Scarabaeiformia
- Family: Scarabaeidae
- Genus: Cotinis
- Species: C. lebasi

Binomial name
- Cotinis lebasi Gory and Percheron, 1833

Synonyms
- Cotinis lebas (Gory and Percheron 1833); Cotinis lebasii (Burmeister 1842); Cotinis lebasi (Bates 1889); Cotinis lebasi panamensis (Casey 1915)

Species of beetle

Cotinis lebasi is a species of the Cotinis scarab genus.
