= Cotinis pueblensis =

Scientific classification
- Domain: Eukaryota
- Kingdom: Animalia
- Phylum: Arthropoda
- Class: Insecta
- Order: Coleoptera
- Suborder: Polyphaga
- Infraorder: Scarabaeiformia
- Family: Scarabaeidae
- Genus: Cotinis
- Species: C. pueblensis

Binomial name
- Cotinis pueblensis Bates 1889

Species of beetle

Cotinis pueblensis is a species of the Cotinis scarab genus.
