= June bug =

June bug or Junebug may refer to:

== Beetles ==
- Phyllophaga, a genus of beetles in the subfamily Melolonthinae of the family Scarabaeidae, also known as June bugs or June beetles
- Green June beetle (Cotinis nitida), of the southeastern US
- Ten-lined June beetle (Polyphylla decemlineata), of the western US and Canada
- Figeater beetle (Cotinis mutabilis), of the western and southwestern US
- European chafer (Rhizotrogus majalis/Amphimallon majalis), native to continental Europe, but now also in North America

== Entertainment ==
=== Songs ===
- "Junebug", by The B-52's
- "Junebug", from the album Good Morning Spider by Sparklehorse
- "Junebug", by Robert Francis
- "June Bug", from the album Stoner Witch by Melvins
- "Junebug", by Stan Van Samang
- "Junebug", by Kate Ryan
- "Junebug", from the album Where the Butterflies Go in the Rain by Raveena
- "Junebug", by The Wonder Years (band)

=== Fictional characters ===
- June Bug, wife of Bucky Bug, a Disney animated character
- Junebug, a Funky Winkerbean comic strip character
- Junebug, a character in Kentucky Route Zero
- Junebug, a character in Girl Haven

=== Films ===
- Junebug (film), 2005

== People ==
- Dale Earnhardt Jr., professional race car driver, nicknamed "June bug"
- DJ Junebug (1958-1983), real name Jose Olmeda Jr., a pioneering DJ and the subject of the 2010 documentary White Lines and the Fever: The Death of DJ Junebug

== Other uses ==
- AEA June Bug, an early aircraft designed by Glenn Curtiss and built in 1908
- "June Bug", a pre-production codename for the Commodore Amiga 600 home computer, named after the B52's song, and released in March 1992

== See also ==
- June bug epidemic, a 1962 case of hysterical contagion in the US
