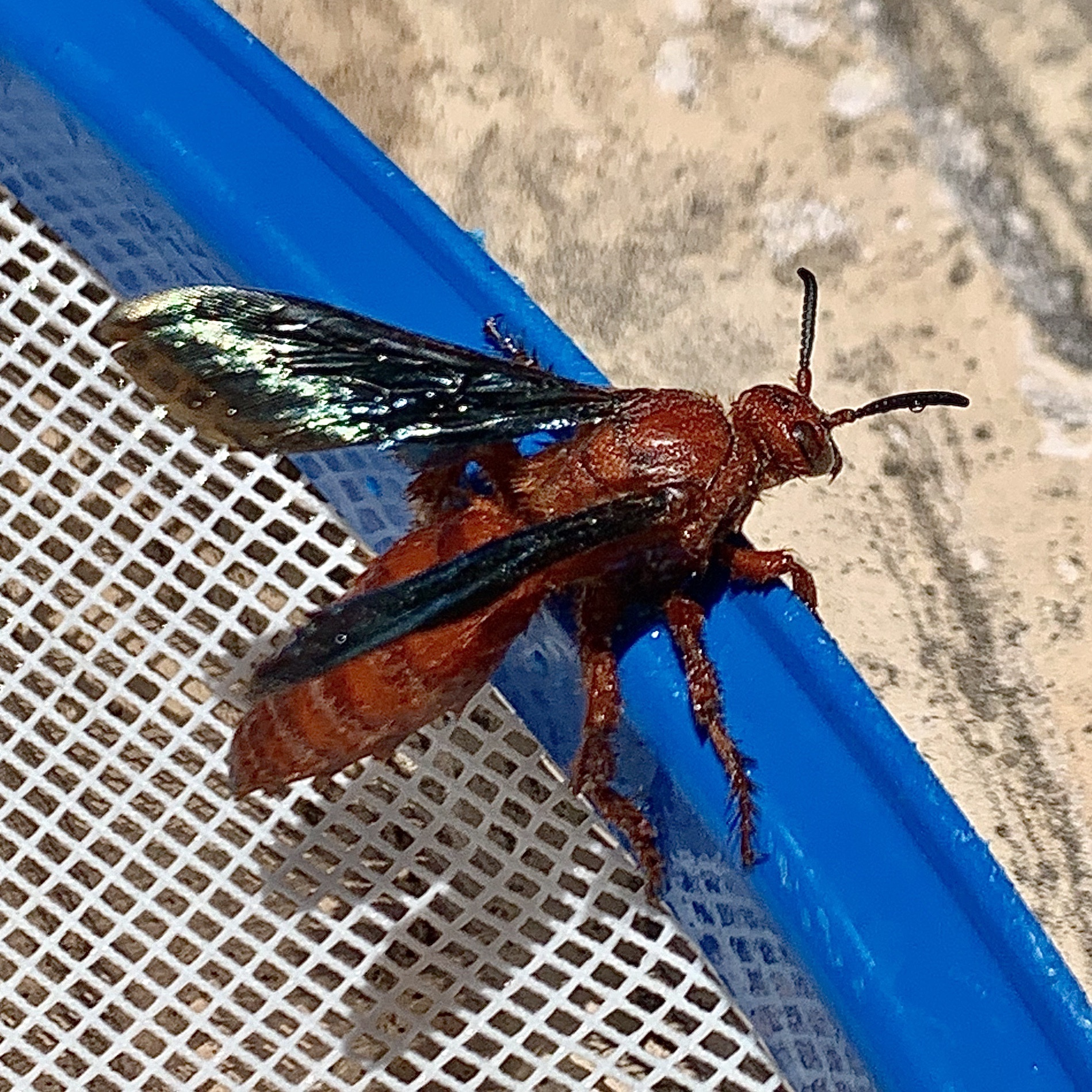
- Triscolia badia

Scientific classification
- Kingdom: Animalia
- Phylum: Arthropoda
- Clade: Pancrustacea
- Class: Insecta
- Order: Hymenoptera
- Family: Scoliidae
- Subfamily: Scoliinae
- Genus: Triscolia de Saussure, 1863

Type species
- Scolia badia (de Saussure, 1863)

Species
- 2 species, see text

= Triscolia =

Genus of wasps

Triscolia is a genus of wasps from the family Scoliidae.

Triscolia is a North American genus ranging from the desert southwest of the United States (Texas west to California) and northern Mexico (Baja California, Baja California Sur, Querétaro, San Luis Potosí, and Sonora).

The genus consists of two species:

- Triscolia ardens (Smith, 1855)
- Triscolia badia (de Saussure, 1863)

== Gallery ==
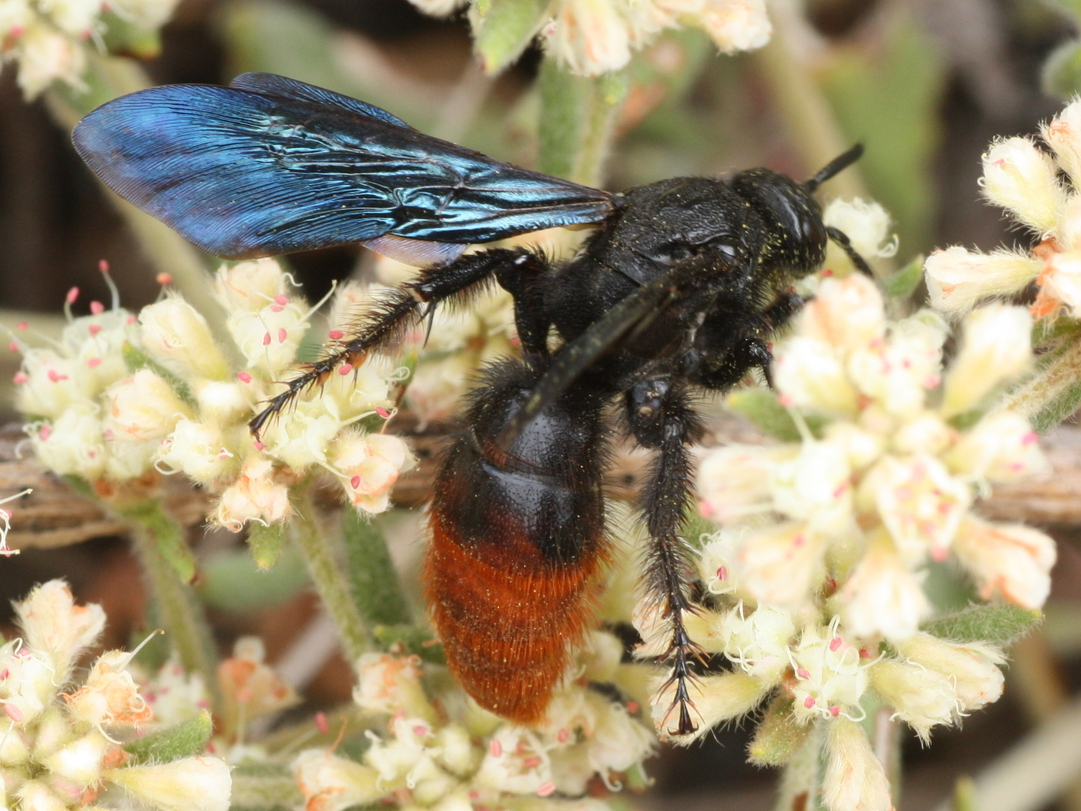
Triscolia ardens

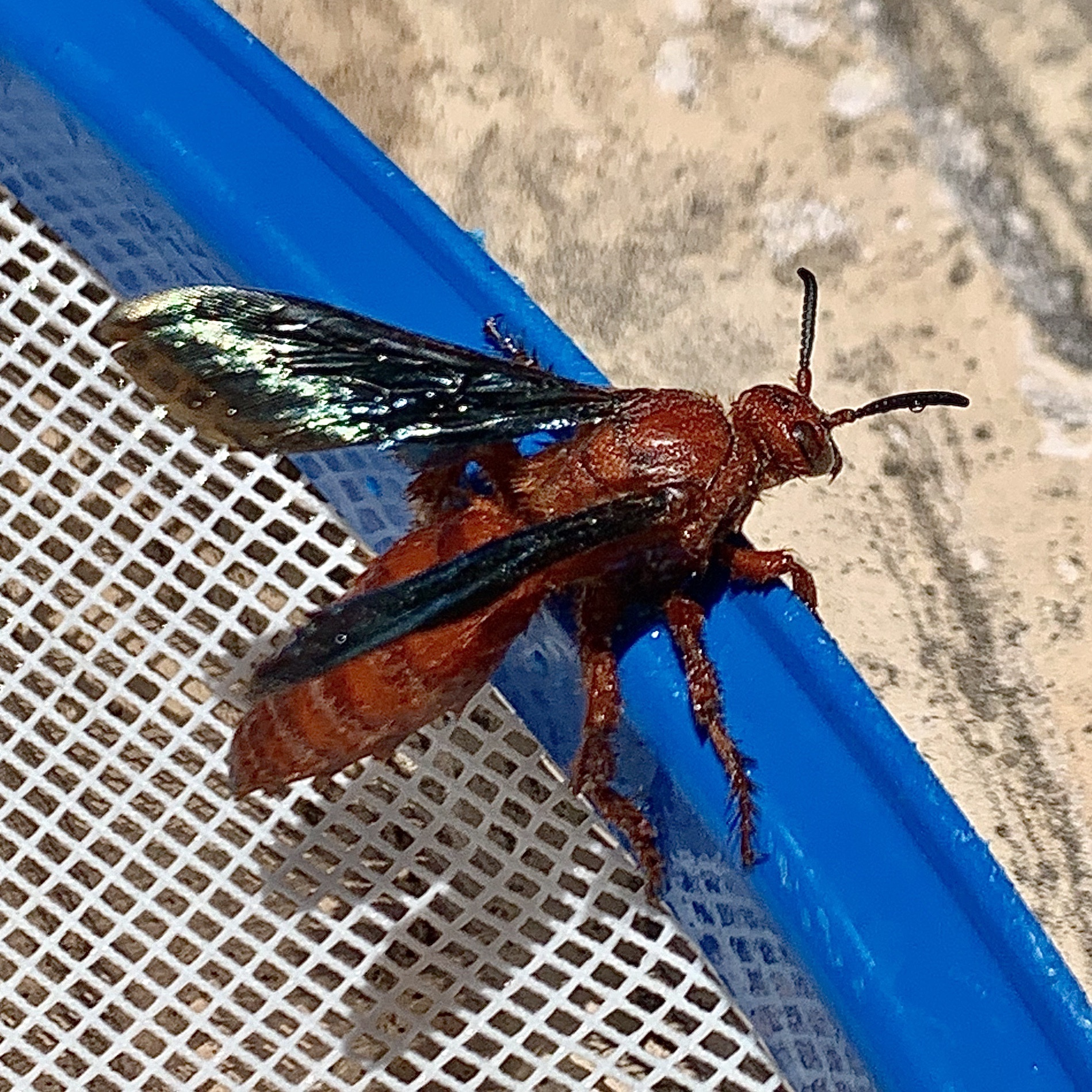
Triscolia badia
