= Cotinis subviolacea =

Scientific classification
- Domain: Eukaryota
- Kingdom: Animalia
- Phylum: Arthropoda
- Class: Insecta
- Order: Coleoptera
- Suborder: Polyphaga
- Infraorder: Scarabaeiformia
- Family: Scarabaeidae
- Genus: Cotinis
- Species: C. subviolacea

Binomial name
- Cotinis subviolacea Gory and Percheron, 1833

Synonyms
- Cotinis plicatipennis Blanchard, 1850

Species of beetle

Cotinis subviolacea is a species of the Cotinis scarab genus. It was described by Hippolyte Louis Gory and Achille Rémy Percheron in 1833. It is found in the United States.
