= Cotinis antonii =

Scientific classification
- Domain: Eukaryota
- Kingdom: Animalia
- Phylum: Arthropoda
- Class: Insecta
- Order: Coleoptera
- Suborder: Polyphaga
- Infraorder: Scarabaeiformia
- Family: Scarabaeidae
- Genus: Cotinis
- Species: C. antonii

Binomial name
- Cotinis antonii Dugés, 1878

Species of beetle

Cotinis antonii is a species of Cotinis scarab. This beetle has been spotted in Cadereyta and Guanajuato in Mexico. These beetles have been photographed on rock surfaces, and seem to prefer dark places. The beetle, like all in the family Scarabaeidae, has a glinting outer shell protecting the main body, and is complete with an all-black exoskeleton. The antennae sprout from the front of the head, branching out into threes. It is part of the Green June Beetles, and currently has no conservation status.
