= 50 Records =

American record label

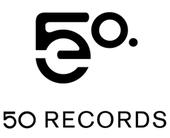
- Parent company: 50 Entertainment
- Founded: 2005
- Founder: Drew Pearson; Dylan Ohm; Deb Ingstad
- Distributor: RED Distribution
- Genre: Alternative rock; rock; pop
- Country of origin: U.S.
- Location: Minneapolis, Minnesota

50 Records was a record label based in Minneapolis which was co-founded in 2006 by Drew Pearson, Dylan Ohm, and Deb Ward-Ingstad. Ward-Ingstad also owns several radio stations in the southern United States and was the label's CEO. Artists on their roster included Minneapolis indie rock band White Light Riot and Elevation. Both bands charted nationally on all three charts at specialty radio receiving high rotation on college radio.

== Activities ==
50 Records partnered with Zude and hosted an event at the 2008 SXSW music festival in Austin, Texas. 50 Records/50 Entertainment were major contributors in organizing the 10,000 Lakes Festival (10KLF) in Detroit Lakes, Minnesota in 2008, primarily in relation to the related Cosmic Break Tour.

A full-length album from Elevation was released in August 2008 by 50 Records/Sony RED. 50 Records album releases have been in collaboration with engineer Adam Ayan (The Rolling Stones, Nirvana), producer Mark Endert (Madonna, Maroon 5), engineer Bob Ludwig, and Dan Hannon (Manchester Orchestra).

Artists represented by 50 Records have been featured in the New York Post, National Public Radio and almost every news and arts publication with local coverage in Minnesota receiving positive reviews. 50 Records produced a charitable compilation album for Faith's Lodge called Hope Rocks. Faith's Lodge has received national recognition on The Today Show and local Minneapolis support from WCCO-TV.

== See also ==
- List of record labels
