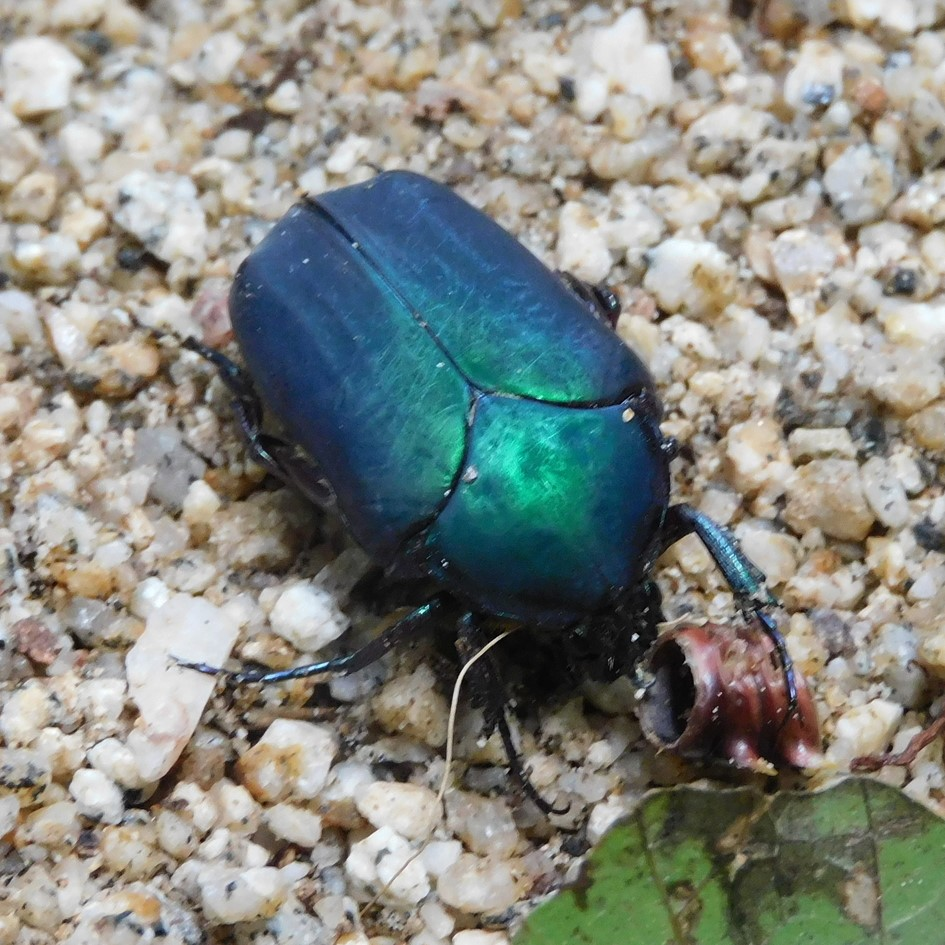

Scientific classification
- Kingdom: Animalia
- Phylum: Arthropoda
- Class: Insecta
- Order: Coleoptera
- Suborder: Polyphaga
- Infraorder: Scarabaeiformia
- Family: Scarabaeidae
- Genus: Cotinis
- Species: C. barthelemyi

Binomial name
- Cotinis barthelemyi Gory and Percheron, 1833

Synonyms
- Gymnetis barthelemy Gory and Percheron, 1833; Cotinis bartholomaei Burmeister, 1842; Cotinis barthelemeyi Bates, 1889

= Cotinis barthelemyi =

Species of beetle

Cotinis barthelemyi is a species of scarab beetle.
