= Cotinis viridicyanea =

Scientific classification
- Domain: Eukaryota
- Kingdom: Animalia
- Phylum: Arthropoda
- Class: Insecta
- Order: Coleoptera
- Suborder: Polyphaga
- Infraorder: Scarabaeiformia
- Family: Scarabaeidae
- Genus: Cotinis
- Species: C. viridicyanea

Binomial name
- Cotinis viridicyanea Perbosc, 1839

Species of beetle

Cotinis viridicyanea is a species of the Cotinis scarab genus.
