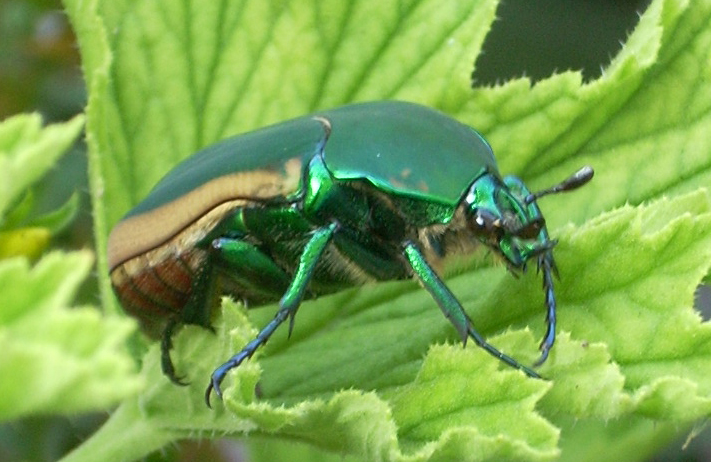
- Cotinis mutabilis, the figeater beetle

Scientific classification
- Kingdom: Animalia
- Phylum: Arthropoda
- Class: Insecta
- Order: Coleoptera
- Suborder: Polyphaga
- Infraorder: Scarabaeiformia
- Family: Scarabaeidae
- Tribe: Gymnetini
- Genus: Cotinis; Burmeister, 1842

Synonyms
- Latemnis Thomson, 1880; Cotinorrhina Schoch, 1895

= Cotinis =

Genus of beetles

Cotinis is a genus of scarab beetles in the subfamily Cetoniinae found throughout North and South America. At least two species (Cotinis mutabilis and Cotinis nitida) are common pests. The genus was erected by Hermann Burmeister in 1842.

== Species ==
The genus contains the following species:

- Cotinis aliena Woodruff, 2008
- Cotinis antonii (Dugés, 1878)
- Cotinis barthelemyi (Gory & Percheron, 1833)
- Cotinis beraudi Delgado, 1998
- Cotinis boylei Goodrich, 1966
- Cotinis columbica Burmeister, 1842
- Cotinis fuscopicea Goodrich, 1966
- Cotinis ibarrai Deloya & Ratcliffe, 1988
- Cotinis impia (Fall, 1905)
- Cotinis laticornis Bates, 1889
- Cotinis lebasi (Gory & Percheron, 1833)
- Cotinis lemoulti Antoine, 2007
- Cotinis mutabilis (Gory & Percheron, 1833)
- Cotinis nitida (Linnaeus, 1764)
- Cotinis olivia Bates, 1889
- Cotinis orientalis Deloya & Ratcliffe, 1988
- Cotinis pauperula Burmeister, 1847
- Cotinis polita Janson, 1876
- Cotinis pokornyi Deloya, Ibáñez-Bernal, & Nogueira, 2000
- Cotinis producta Bates, 1889
- Cotinis pueblensis Bates, 1889
- Cotinis punctatostriata Bates, 1889
- Cotinis rufipennis Bates, 1889
- Cotinis sinitoc Deloya, Ibáñez-Bernal, & Nogueira, 2000
- Cotinis sphyracera Deloya & Ratcliffe, 1988
- Cotinis subviolacea (Gory & Percheron, 1833)
- Cotinis viridicyanea (Perbosc, 1839)
