= Cotinis orientalis =

Scientific classification
- Domain: Eukaryota
- Kingdom: Animalia
- Phylum: Arthropoda
- Class: Insecta
- Order: Coleoptera
- Suborder: Polyphaga
- Infraorder: Scarabaeiformia
- Family: Scarabaeidae
- Genus: Cotinis
- Species: C. orientalis

Binomial name
- Cotinis orientalis Deloya and Ratcliffe, 1988

Species of beetle

Cotinis orientalis is a species of the Cotinis scarab genus.
