= Cotinis columbica =

Scientific classification
- Kingdom: Animalia
- Phylum: Arthropoda
- Class: Insecta
- Order: Coleoptera
- Suborder: Polyphaga
- Infraorder: Scarabaeiformia
- Family: Scarabaeidae
- Genus: Cotinis
- Species: C. columbica

Binomial name
- Cotinis columbica Burmeister, 1842

Species of beetle

Cotinis columbica is a species of the Cotinis scarab genus.
