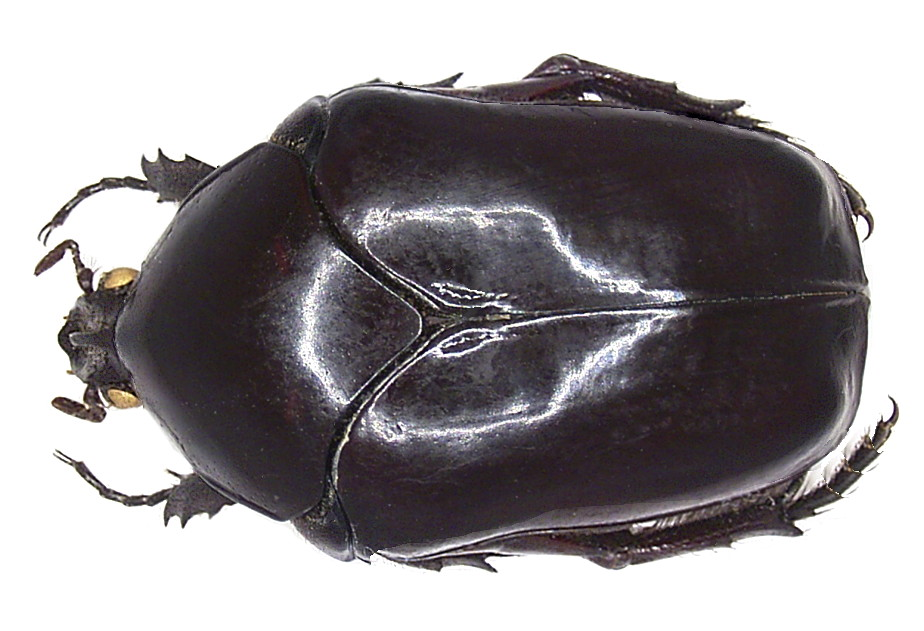

Scientific classification
- Domain: Eukaryota
- Kingdom: Animalia
- Phylum: Arthropoda
- Class: Insecta
- Order: Coleoptera
- Suborder: Polyphaga
- Infraorder: Scarabaeiformia
- Family: Scarabaeidae
- Genus: Cotinis
- Species: C. fuscopicea

Binomial name
- Cotinis fuscopicea Goodrich, 1966

= Cotinis fuscopicea =

Species of beetle

Cotinis fuscopicea is a species of Cotinis. It is indigenous to Mexico and Guatemala.
