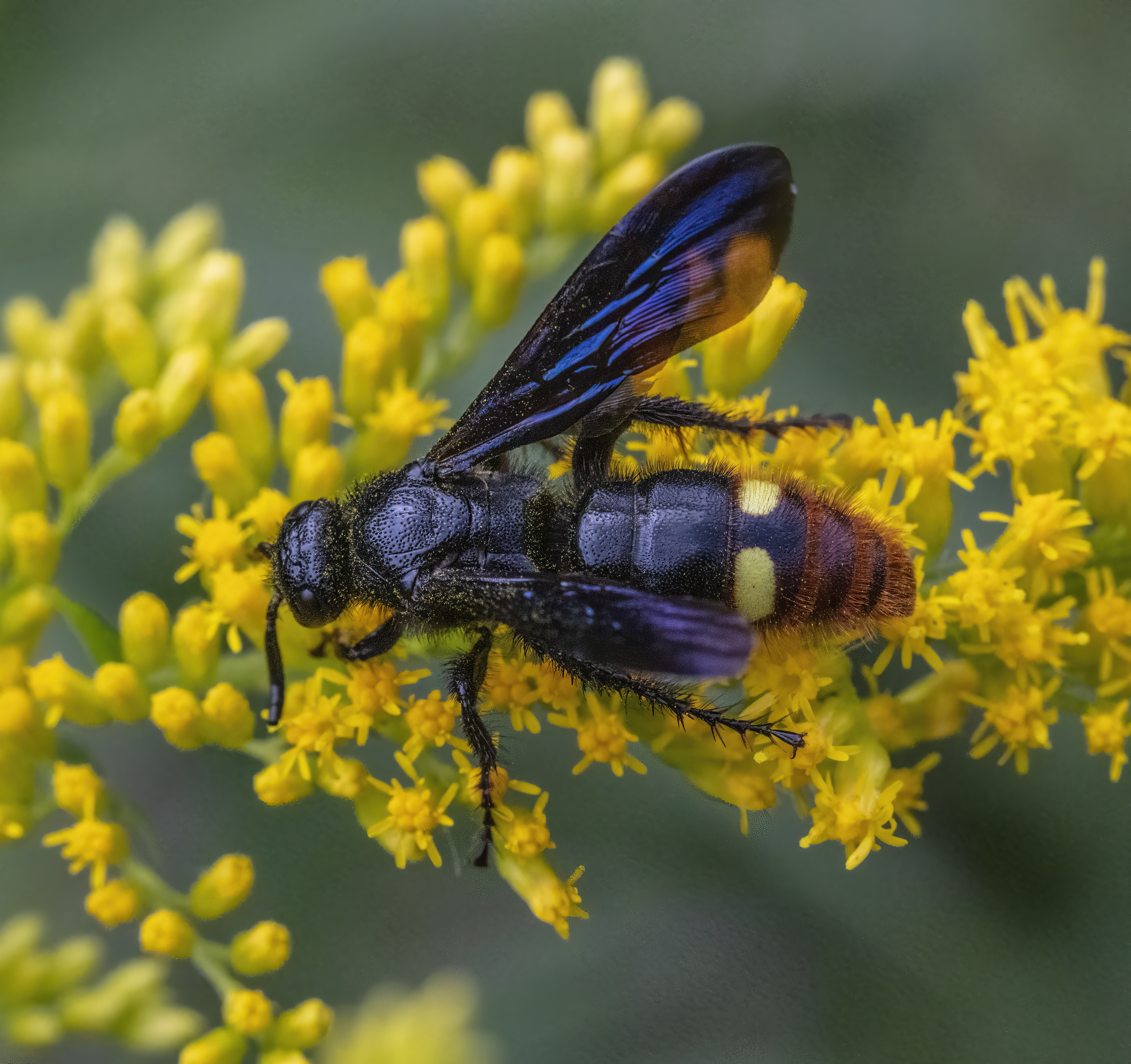
- Scolia dubia dubia in Maryland on goldenrod

Scientific classification
- Kingdom: Animalia
- Phylum: Arthropoda
- Clade: Pancrustacea
- Class: Insecta
- Order: Hymenoptera
- Family: Scoliidae
- Genus: Scolia
- Species: S. dubia

Binomial name
- Scolia dubia Say, 1837

= Scolia dubia =

Species of wasp

S. dubia in New York

Scolia dubia, also known as the two-spotted scoliid wasp or a blue-winged scoliid wasp, is a species in the family Scoliidae.

== Description and identification ==
S. dubia is a 2.0–2.5-centimeter (0.8–1.0 in) long wasp. The body is black from the head through the first or second segment of the abdomen. The second third abdominal segment and beyond are red. The nominate subspecies possesses has the second abdominal segment black and two yellow spots on the third tergite, which are lacking in the subspecies S. dubia haematodes. The wings are violaceous or with blueish reflections.

Males are colored as the female of their respective subspecies but have longer antennae and seven rather than six metasomal segments.

The subspecies S. dubia haematodes is colored much like Triscolia ardens but can be recognized by the forewing only possessing two submarginal cells rather than three in T. ardens.

== Distribution ==
This species ranges from New England to Florida and west to California in the United States. The southern extent of its range extends to Coahuila, Mexico.

== Biology ==
Females burrow into ground in search of grubs, particularly those of the green June beetle, Cotinis nitida, and some research suggests, possibly the Japanese beetle, Popillia japonica. The wasp stings the grub and frequently burrows farther down to construct a cell and lay an egg on the host. The larva pupates and overwinters inside the body of the host.

Adults collect nectar from flowers from July to September or October.

Males of this species have been observed taking part in large mating flights from mid-August to early September in Virginia.

== Subspecies ==
There are two subspecies of S. dubia:

- Scolia dubia dubia Say, 1837
- Scolia dubia haematoes Burmeister, 1854

== Gallery ==
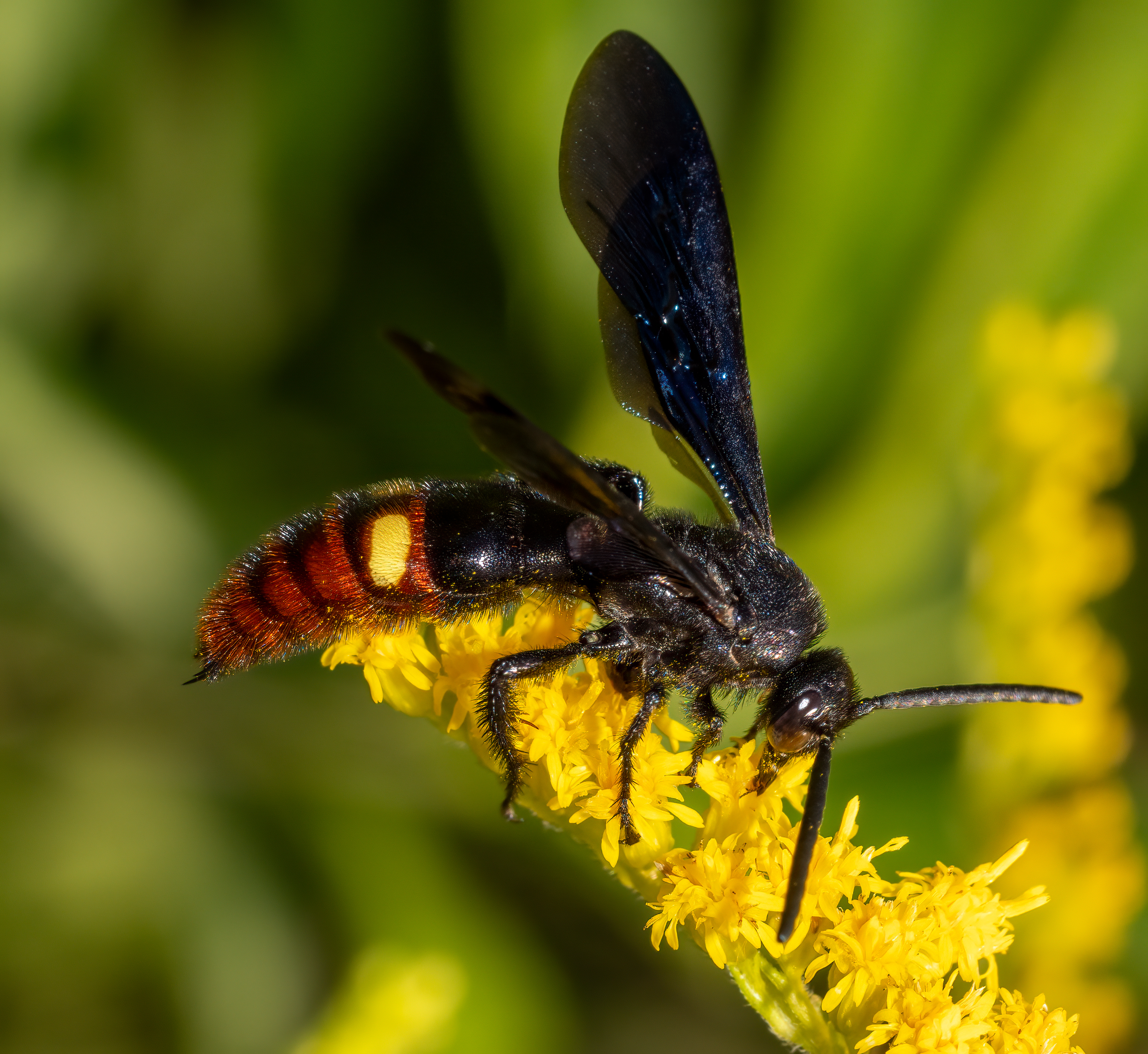
Scolia dubia dubia photographed in New York.

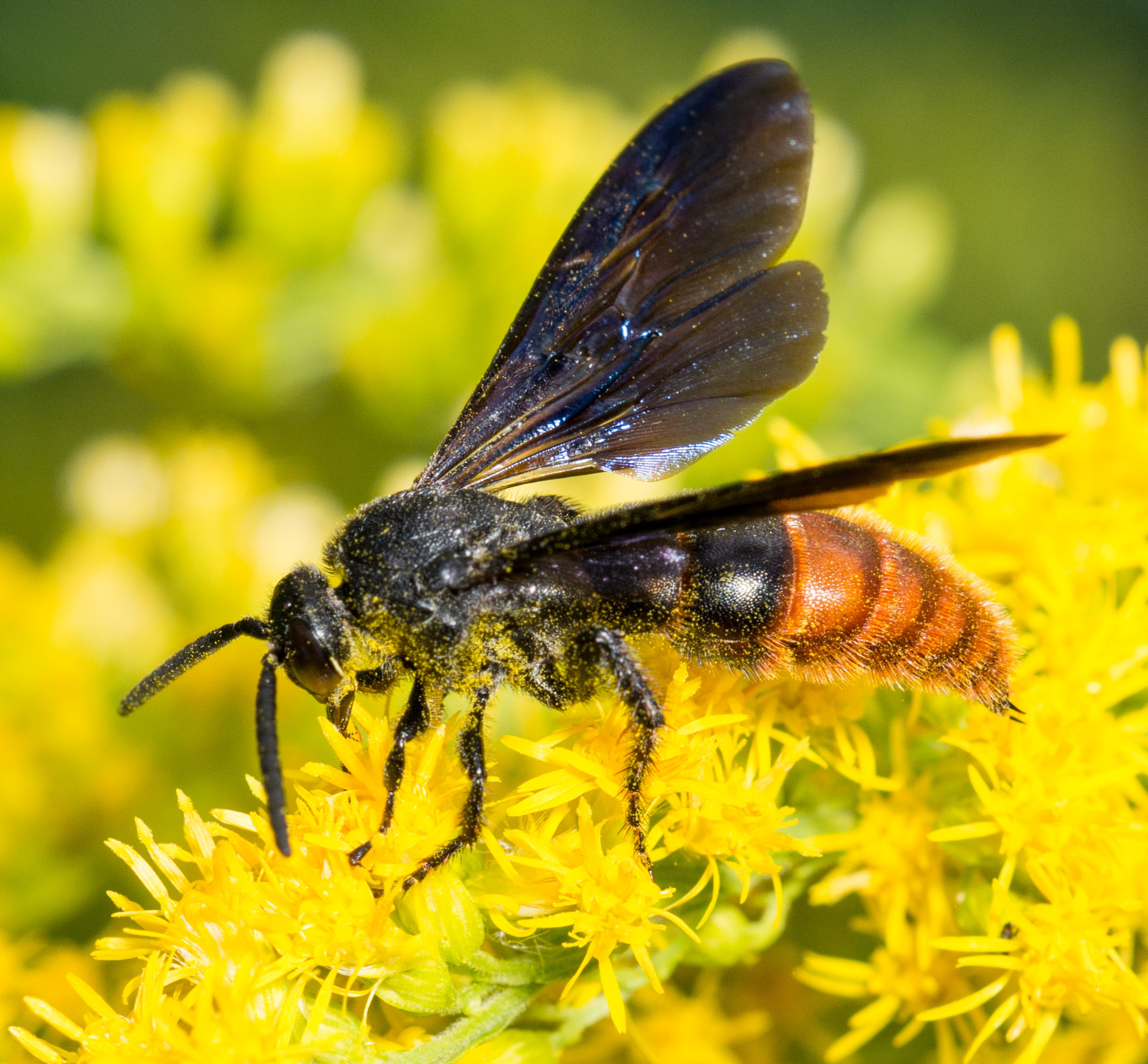
Scolia dubia haematodes photographed in Texas.

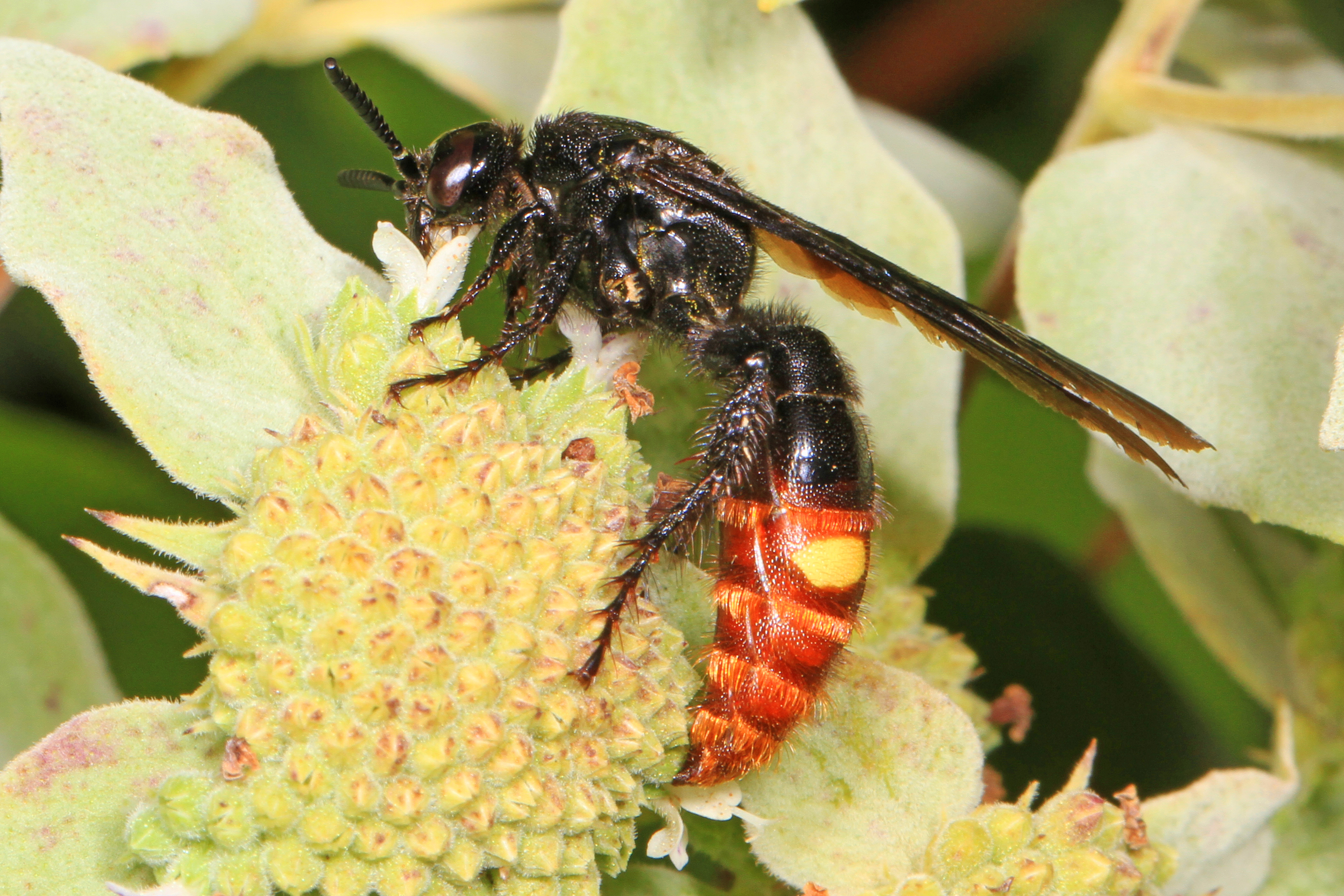
Scolia dubia dubia in Virginia
