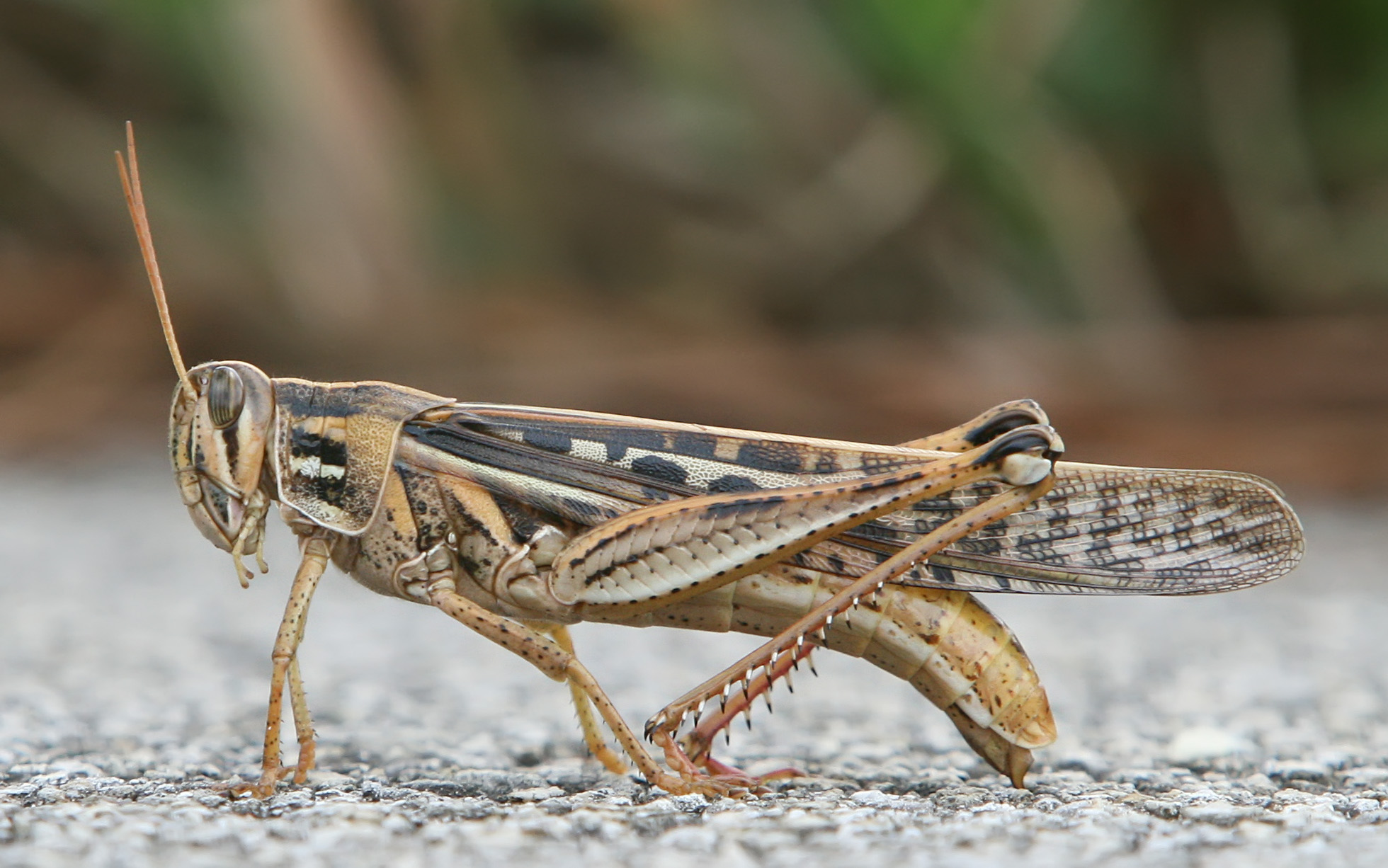

Conservation status
- Secure (NatureServe)

Scientific classification
- Kingdom: Animalia
- Phylum: Arthropoda
- Clade: Pancrustacea
- Class: Insecta
- Order: Orthoptera
- Suborder: Caelifera
- Family: Acrididae
- Subfamily: Cyrtacanthacridinae
- Tribe: Cyrtacanthacridini
- Genus: Schistocerca
- Species: S. americana

Binomial name
- Schistocerca americana Drury, 1770

Synonyms
- S. ambiguum Thomas, 1872; S. approximans Walker, 1870; S. interrupta Walker, 1870; S. rusticus Fabricius, 1775; S. vittatum Palisot de Beauvois, 1805

= Schistocerca americana =

Species of grasshopper

Schistocerca americana is a species of grasshopper in the family Acrididae known commonly as the American grasshopper and American bird grasshopper. It is native to North America, where it occurs in the eastern United States, Mexico, and the Bahamas. Occasional, localized outbreaks of this grasshopper occur, and it is often referred to as a locust, though it lacks the true swarming form of its congener, the desert locust (S. gregaria).

== Description ==
The adult male of the species is up to 4.5 cm (1.8 in) long, and the adult female may reach 5.5 cm (2.2 in). The body of the adult is generally yellow-brown in color and the wings are pale with large brown spots. The nymphs are different in appearance. They change color as they mature and their coloration is a polyphenic trait – influenced by environmental conditions, producing multiple forms from one genotype. This is not uncommon among grasshoppers. In this species, the coloration of the nymphs is especially influenced by temperature. Nymphs are various shades of green, yellow, or red, usually with a pattern of black markings. They are often red at lower temperatures, but at higher temperatures, only green and yellow shades occur. Black patterning is also influenced by temperature, with lower temperatures inducing darker markings. Density is also a common factor in color polyphenism, but it is less important in this species than in many other grasshoppers. Nymphs reared in crowded conditions develop darker black markings, but density has little effect on their background colors.

== Taxonomy ==
S. americana is closely related to the tropical swarming locust S. piceifrons with which it can be readily hybridized in the laboratory.

== Development ==
Two generations occur per year. The female lays up to three clutches of eggs in a season. A clutch contains 60 to 80 light orange eggs, each about 7 to 8 mm long. The eggs stick together in a frothy mass and the female deposits the mass up to 3 cm deep in the soil. In 3 to 4 weeks, the nymphs emerge and dig to the surface. They remain in a group, feeding together, becoming less gregarious as they develop.

An individual usually progresses through six instars during development, but in low densities, some nymphs complete five. The first-instar nymph is up to 9 mm long and lacks wing structures. The second instar has wing pads and more segments in its antennae. The third instar is up to 2 cm long and the wing pads are triangular. The fourth instar has venation in its wing pads. The fifth instar is up to 3.5 cm long and the wing pads have changed position. By the sixth instar, the wings have elongated.

This species overwinters as an adult rather than in the egg, as many other grasshoppers do.

== Impacts ==
This is not a severe agricultural pest in terms of economic losses, but it can sometimes cause significant damage to many kinds of crops. It is perhaps best known in Florida, where it can be a pest of citrus. When conditions are right, "population explosions" occur and masses of grasshoppers descend on crop plants. It can defoliate trees and eat smaller plants to the ground. Though its outbreaks are rare, it is considered to be the most destructive grasshopper in Florida.

Besides citrus, it is known to feed on corn, cotton, oats, peanut, rye, sugarcane, tobacco, vegetable crops, and ornamentals. Other host plants include many grasses, such as bahiagrass, bermudagrass, and crabgrass. It can infest dogwood, hickory, and palm trees. It can also damage buildings with chewing activity, particularly objects such as window screens.

== Chemistry ==
This species was the source of a newly discovered class of chemical compounds called caeliferins. These are fatty acid chains present in the grasshopper's regurgitant. When the grasshopper feeds on a plant, the caeliferins in the regurgitant induce the plant to release volatile organic compounds. This is a common response to herbivory in plants; the volatile organic compounds are attractive to predators of the herbivorous insects. Caeliferins may also play a role in defense, as the grasshopper expels large amounts of regurgitant when attacked.
