= White Light Riot =

Indie rock band from Minneapolis

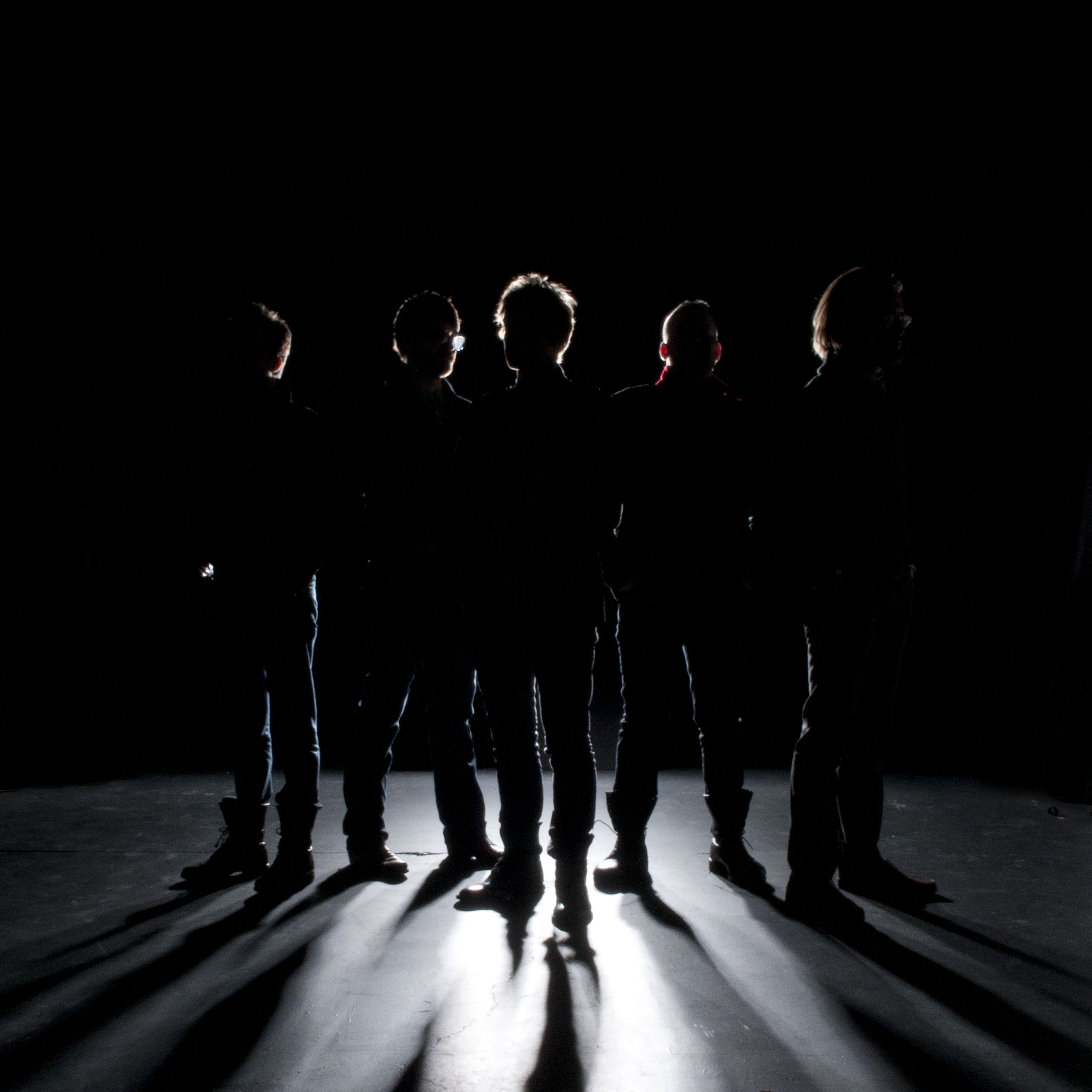

Background information
- Origin: Minneapolis, Minnesota, United States
- Genres: Indie rock, alternative rock, progressive rock, pop
- Years active: 2005–present
- Label: 50 Records
- Past members: Mike Schwandt; Mark Schwandt; Dan Larsen; Randy Tomes; Zack Carroll; Joe Christenson
- Website: whitelightriot.com

White Light Riot was an American indie rock group based in Minneapolis, Minnesota. Members included brothers Mike Schwandt (vocals, rhythm guitar) and Mark Schwandt (drums), Dan Larsen (bass), Randy Tomes (keyboards) and Zack Caroll (guitar). White Light Riot is sometimes abbreviated as WLR.

== History ==
In early 2005, brothers Mike and Mark Schwandt formed the band. During their junior year in high school at Robbinsdale Armstrong High School, Mike was studying abroad in England and Mark took on the task of finding additional band members. He recruited Dan Larsen, a bassist in their jazz band and invited another classmate, guitarist Joe Christenson to join the ensemble.

White Light Riot was formerly named The Evening Glow but changed their name almost immediately.

=== Early years ===
In late 2005, White Light Riot released their first EP The Dark Is Light Enough, produced by Erik Appelwick (Tapes 'n Tapes) on October 30, 2005. In early 2010, "Bitter Beginning" and "Out of Sight" were featured in the Destineer Games title Triple Crown Snowboarding for Nintendo Wii.

=== Atomism ===
In 2006, the band signed with 50 Records, a Minneapolis-based independent record label. “Atomism," the sole album they released on 50 Records, was recorded at Pachyderm Studio in Cannon Falls, MN; produced/co-engineered by Brent Sigmeth (Grant Hart, They Might Be Giants, Ramblin’ Jack Elliott), co-engineered by Paul Marino (The New Congress, Desdemona) and mastered by Bob Ludwig. It was released nationally on August 21, 2007 by RED Distribution. The CD release party was held on June 23, 2007 at the Fine Line Music Café in Minneapolis, MN.

In 2007, they were hired for a benefit show that raised $15,000.

In 2009 lead singer Mike Schwandt posted on the band's Myspace and Facebook Pages that they ended their contract with 50 Records. Schwandt explains we "finally broke free from their grasp.". Around this time, guitarist Joe Christenson left the group and was replaced by Zack Carroll, who previously played with This World Fair and Catchpenny.

In January 2010, the song "Forever in the West" was featured on the season finale of the VH1 program Secrets of Aspen.

In 2012 they did a reunion show in Minneapolis.

=== Self-Titled LP ===
After parting ways with their record label, the band spent 2010 recording their self-titled follow-up album with Paul Marino at Urness Hall at St. Olaf College, Fuzzy Slippers Studio, and The Terrarium. The album was released on May 2, 2011.

== Discography ==
=== Albums ===
Year	Album	Label
2005	The Dark is Light Enough	Independent
2007	Atomism	50 Records
2011	White Light Riot	Independent
