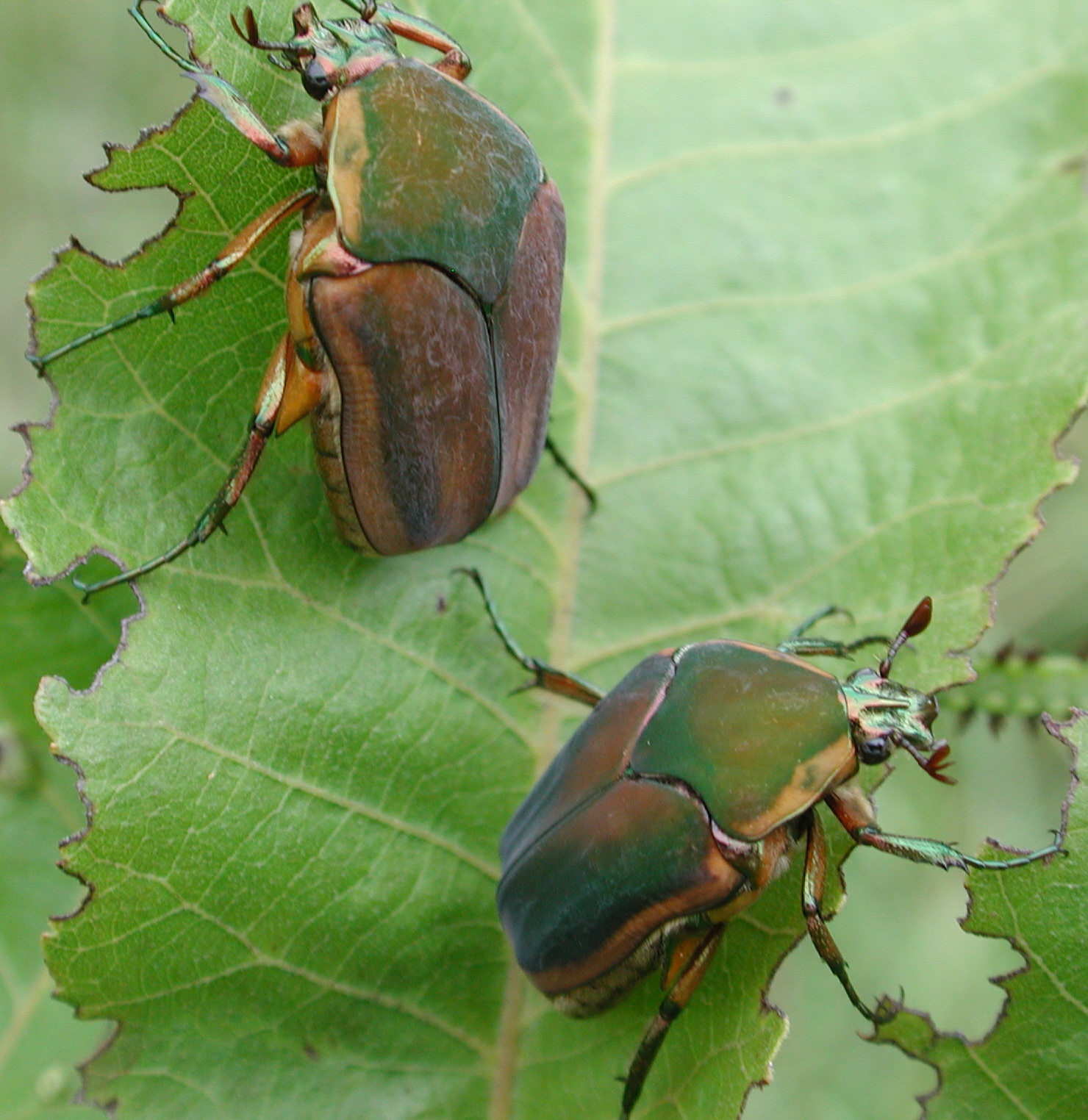

Scientific classification
- Kingdom: Animalia
- Phylum: Arthropoda
- Clade: Pancrustacea
- Class: Insecta
- Order: Coleoptera
- Suborder: Polyphaga
- Infraorder: Scarabaeiformia
- Family: Scarabaeidae
- Genus: Cotinis
- Species: C. nitida

Binomial name
- Cotinis nitida (Linnaeus, 1758)

= Cotinis nitida =

Species of beetle

Cotinis nitida, commonly known as the green June beetle, June bug or June beetle, is a beetle of the family Scarabaeidae. It is found in the eastern United States and Canada, where it is most abundant in the South. It is sometimes confused with the related southwestern species figeater beetle Cotinis mutabilis, which is less destructive.

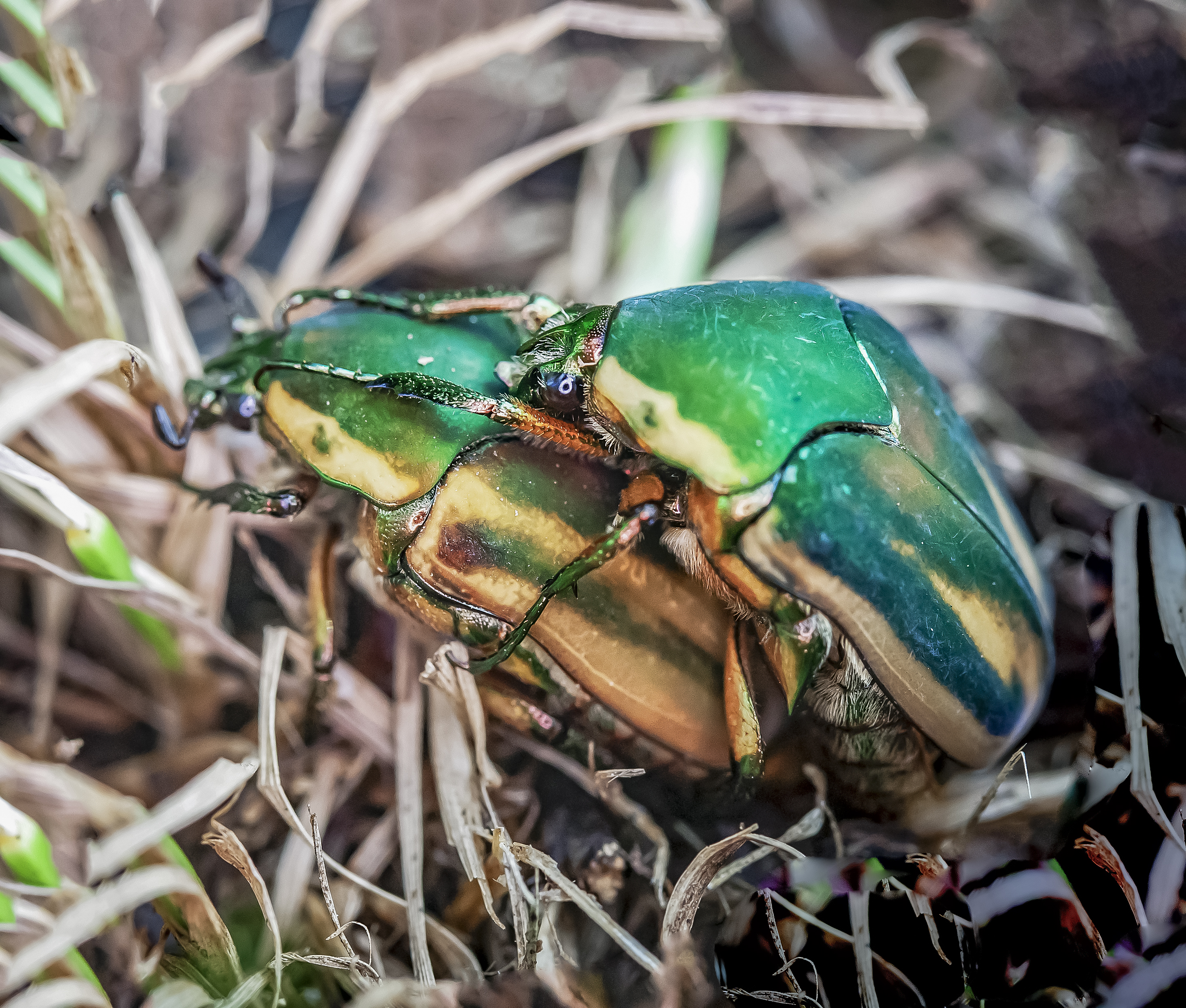
Green June beetles mating

The green June beetle is active during daylight hours. The adult is usually 15–22 mm (0.6–0.9 in) long with dull, metallic green wings; its sides are gold and the head, legs and underside are very bright shiny green. Their habitat extends from New Brunswick to Georgia, and as far west as California, with possible population crossover in Texas with their western cousin, the figeater beetle.

== Description ==
The green June beetle is a part of the Scarabaeidae family, with defining characteristics such as modified forewings called elytra sinuate, and a prominent mesosternum. The scutellum is covered by the prothorax attached to the base node. The Cotinis genus is separated by the male species having a small horn on the lower portion of the face (clypeus).

This beetle species differs from the common brown May or June beetle by its larger body index and vibrant color. This varies from a green striped, brown beetle to a full velvet green body. The insects' margins are usually light brown or yellow with a metallic green or brown underside. The insect is typically ¾-1.5 inches in length. Compared to the legs of a common June beetle, the legs are shorter, and the body is stouter.

== Life cycle ==
The complete life cycle for the green June beetle is one year.

=== Egg ===
Mating occurs in the early morning. The male is attracted by a strongly scented milky fluid secreted by the female. Mating lasts only a few minutes after which the female enters her burrow or crawls under matted grass. Once the mating process has taken place, the female will lay between 60 and 75 eggs underground during a two-week period. The eggs, when first laid, appear white and elliptical in shape, gradually becoming more spherical as the larvae develop. The eggs hatch in approximately 18 days into small, white grubs.

=== Larva ===
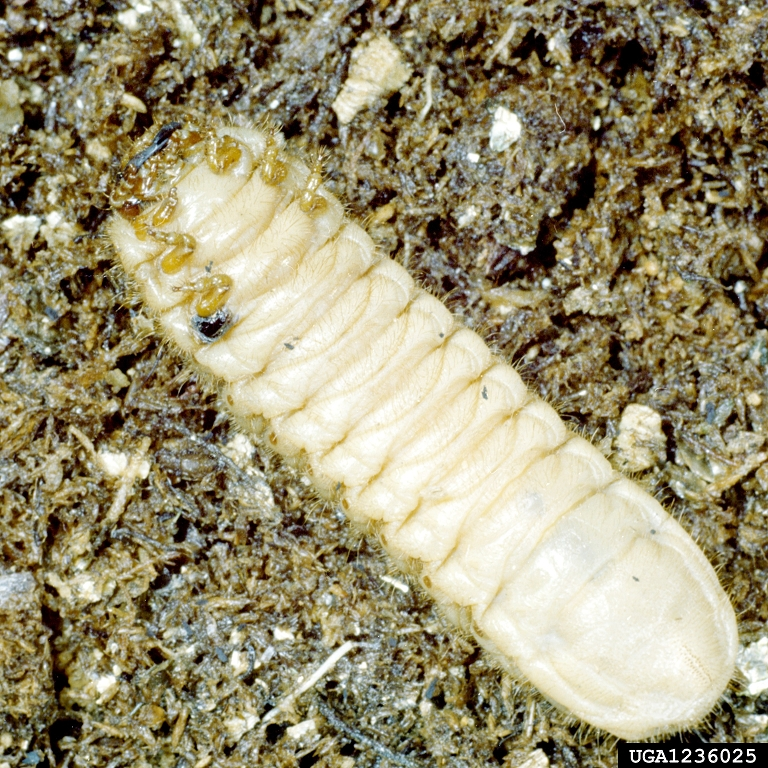
June beetle larva stage

The grubs will grow to about 40 mm (1.6 in) and are white with a brownish-black head and brown spiracles along the sides of the body. The larvae will molt twice before winter. The fully grown larva color is glassy yellowish white shading toward green or blue at the head and tail. The larva has stiff ambulatory bristles on its abdomen which assist movement. The larva normally travels on its back. The underground speed is considered more rapid than any other known genus of Scarabaeidae in the United States and is comparable to that of the hairy caterpillar. The larvae feed largely on humus and mold but can do considerable damage to plant root systems. Injury has been reported to vegetables and ornamental plants, particularly those which have been mulched. The larvae are considered pests when they cause damage to lawns or turf grasses. The insect is considered more injurious in its larval stages than as a beetle. Pupation occurs after the third larval stage, which lasts nearly nine months. The pupal stage occurs in an oval cocoon constructed of dirt particles fastened together by a viscid fluid excreted by the larva. The pupa is white when first formed but develops greenish tints just before emergence.

=== Adult ===
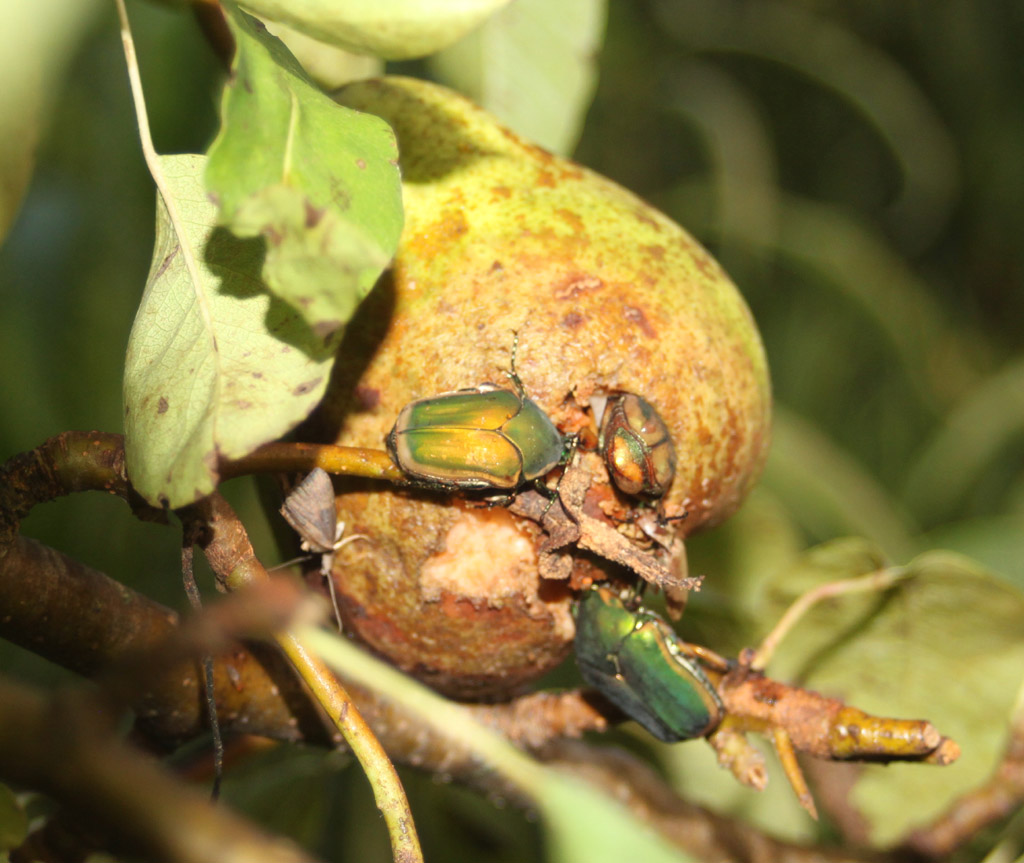
Fruit damage caused by Cotinis nitida

The adults begin to appear in June after 18 days of the pupation period. The adult is from 15–22 mm (0.6–0.9 in) in length and 12 mm (0.5 in) in width. The colour varies from dull brown with green stripes to a uniform metallic green. The margins of the elytra vary from light brown to orange yellow. The adult beetle will feed upon a variety of fruits including berries, grapes, peaches, nectarines, apples, pears and figs. Adults are particularly attracted to rotting fruit which often occurs after an initial damage to sound fruit.

== Predation ==
The grubs of the beetle are largely held in control by natural predators.

Adult beetles are often eaten by birds, including robins, blue jays, and brown thrashers. Blue jays either immediately consume the beetle or repeatedly slam them into the ground before eating them.

Tall grasses offer beetles some protection, but they are easily hunted by birds in lawns with shorter grasses maintained by human interventions.

== Interactions ==
=== With one another ===
There is intense competition between males for access to mates and oftentimes more than one male tries to mate with a female at the same time. Part of this competition is because females are only receptive to mating attempts once in a given period of time, whereas males can mate repeatedly.

=== With other insects ===
The larval stages of the friendly fly or large flesh fly (Sarcophaga aldrichi) have been observed attached near the base of the head and thorax of the adult beetle. The fly larvae have been observed inside the devoured thorax and abdomen of the beetle.

The flesh fly (Sarcophaga helicobia) has been observed to prey on both the larval and adult stage of the June beetle.

The digger wasp (Scolia dubia) attacks the larval stage of the beetle. The female will crawl into the larva burrow and lay her eggs on the grub.

=== With vertebrates ===
Below ground, large number of larvae are consumed by moles. During rainy periods, when the burrows of the larvae are flooded, the larvae will crawl to the surface. At these times, the larvae are subject to predation by raccoons, gophers, skunks, opossums, and chipmunks. Birds, notably the American crow, common grackle, northern mockingbird and blue jay, will also attack the adult.

== Geographic range ==
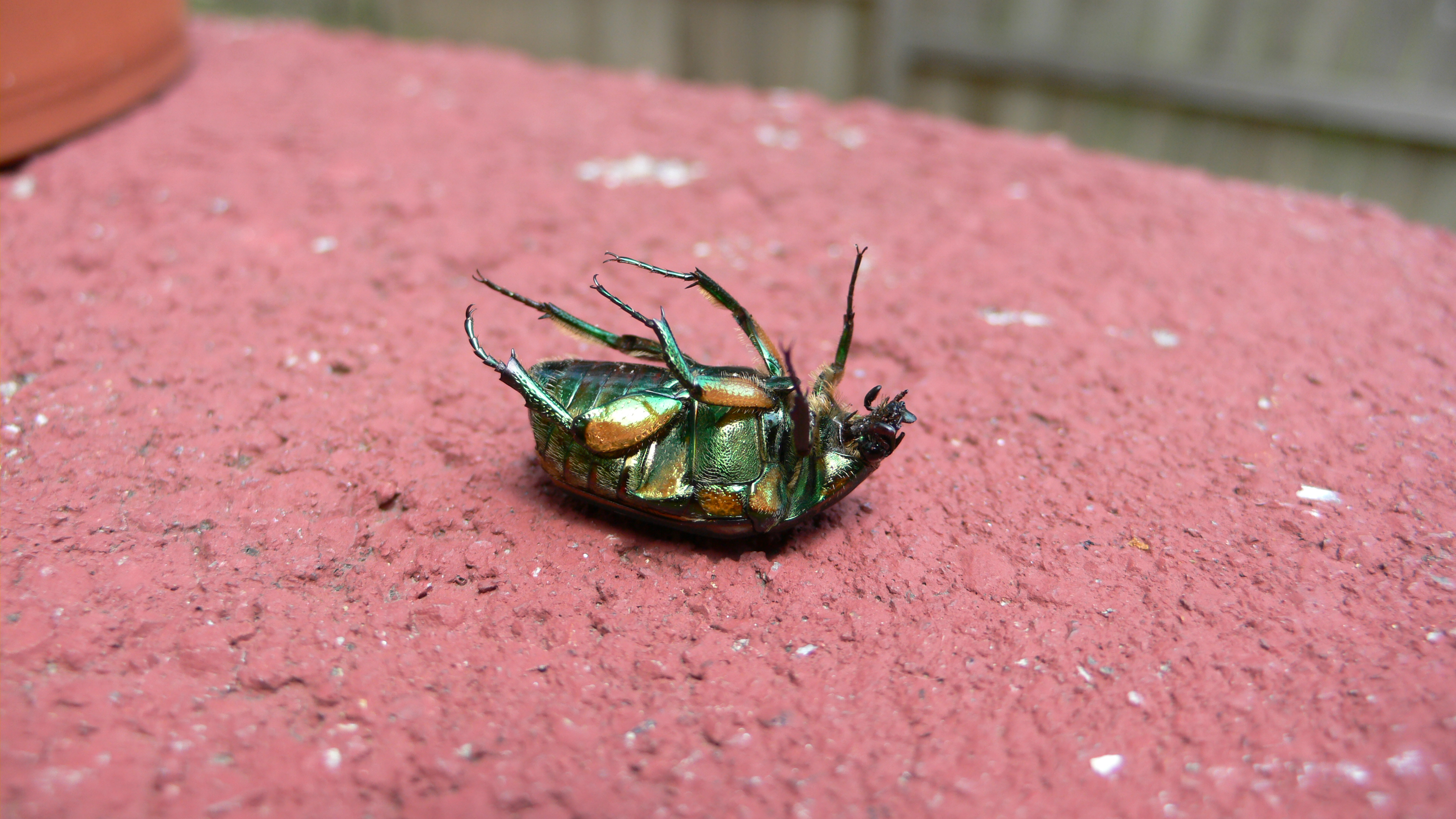
The corpse of a green June beetle in the suburbs of Atlanta, Georgia

The geographic range of Cotinis nitida extends across the eastern United States and Canada, with its highest abundance in the South. They can be found from New Brunswick to Georgia and westward as far as California, with possible population overlap with their western cousin, the figeater beetle (Cotinis mutabilis).

The green June beetle is a Nearctic species of beetle. It is commonly found in New York, Florida, Nebraska, and Texas. Larvae of green June beetles live in the soil underground, and adults live on their host plants. They can be found on lawns, fields, and forests. They inhabit extensive habitats.

== Habitat preferences ==
Green June beetles are common during the warmer months, more specifically June. During the summer months is usually when they reproduce, which is why they are more abundant during that time. The warmer months provide an organic matter in the soil that the females place the eggs in, which allows the green June beetle larvae to feed after they hatch.

As adults, green June beetles are common during the springtime because plants are flourishing. These beetles can be seen around garden-like areas because they feed on the decomposing plants. Green June beetles are likely to be on an older field than a newly developed field, as the older field contains a high amount of organic matter.

== Economic importance ==
Cotinis nitida can be prevented from causing large damage to crops by covering crops in pesticide. Pesticide usage can build up in water runoff and affect local communities and their water supply, leading to an increase in spending involving water purification. This increase in pesticides also causes issues involving cattle, mainly swine, and may cause health defects. Attempting to use these pesticides may cause a loss in other areas of earnings involving these same farms.

Green June beetles often follow other predatory bug species in consuming plants, as they do not typically consume fruits which have not already been broken open. As such, if other predatory insects are kept from crops, the green June beetle should not become an issue in terms of gross earnings for any specific crop.
