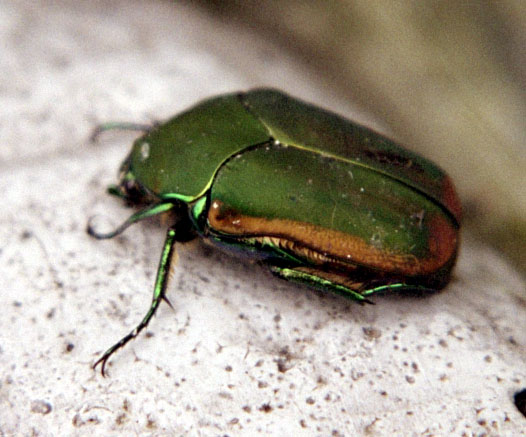

Scientific classification
- Kingdom: Animalia
- Phylum: Arthropoda
- Clade: Pancrustacea
- Class: Insecta
- Order: Coleoptera
- Suborder: Polyphaga
- Infraorder: Scarabaeiformia
- Family: Scarabaeidae
- Genus: Cotinis
- Species: C. mutabilis

Binomial name
- Cotinis mutabilis (Gory & Percheron, 1883)

= Figeater beetle =

Species of beetle

The figeater beetle (also green fruit beetle or fig beetle, Cotinis mutabilis) is a member of the scarab beetle family in the subfamily Cetoniinae, comprising a group of beetles commonly called flower chafers, since many of them feed on pollen, nectar, or petals. Its habitat covers primarily the southwestern United States (including California) and Mexico, extending south to northern South America. Within the figeater beetle's cuticle, twisted fibers are arranged in stacked layers. When light hits those layers, it bends and creates a distinct iridescent color. Figeater beetles are often mistaken for green June beetles (Cotinis nitida) and occasionally Japanese beetles (Popillia japonica), which occur in the Eastern US. C. mutabilis are also named by the synonym C. texana.

== Life cycle ==
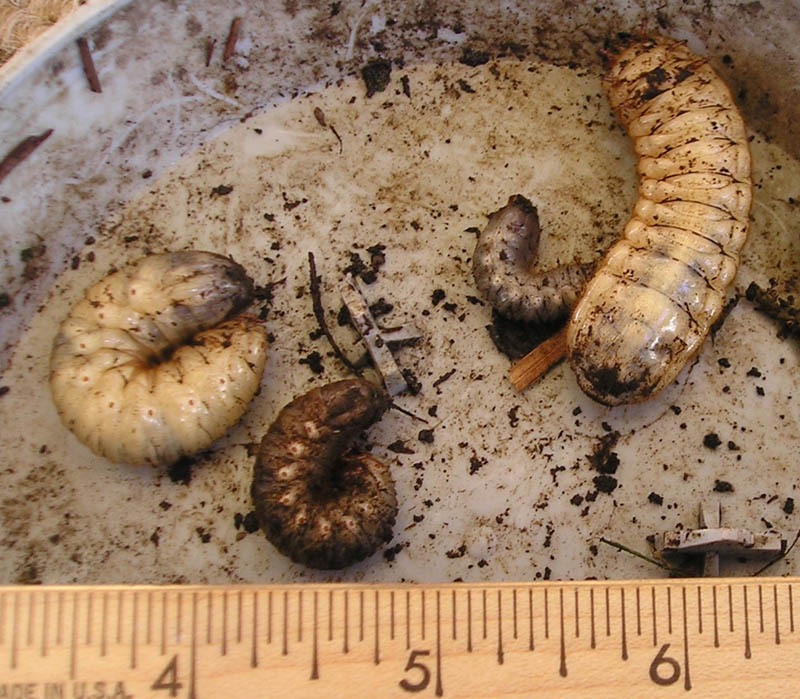
Various larval stages: One shows its typical C-shaped position; another stretches out upside down to move—its legs are visible at the upper end.

After mating, eggs are laid in decaying matter or compost piles, which provide sustenance for the emerging larvae. Oviposition takes place over an extended period of about three months, beginning in early August and continuing until the end of October. Eggs measure approximately 1.8 mm wide and 2.3 mm long and have a whitish color. In laboratory conditions with optimal temperatures, eggs hatch within one week. Laboratory reared larvae measure 2-3 mm in length, while fully grown third instar grubs can reach 7.5 cm in length and weigh 5 grams. Larvae are white with a yellow-brown head. Figeater beetle larvae are sometimes called "back crawlers" because although larvae have legs, they are ineffective for movement. Instead of using their legs, larvae roll onto their backs and push forward with rows of bristles to move in a wave-like manner.

When ready to pupate, mature larvae build a small underground egg shaped chamber roughly 2-2.5 cm by 2.5-3.5 cm. The pupation stage lasts several months without emerging until summer rains soften the soil. In Oaxaca, Mexico, adult figeater beetles are seen in nature during the months of April to November. Adult figeater beetles grow to about 1.25 inches (3.2 cm). They are active during daylight hours, often congregating in the shade of trees near choice breeding grounds to find mates. A wild figeater beetle's entire life cycle lasts 12 months.

== Adult morphology ==
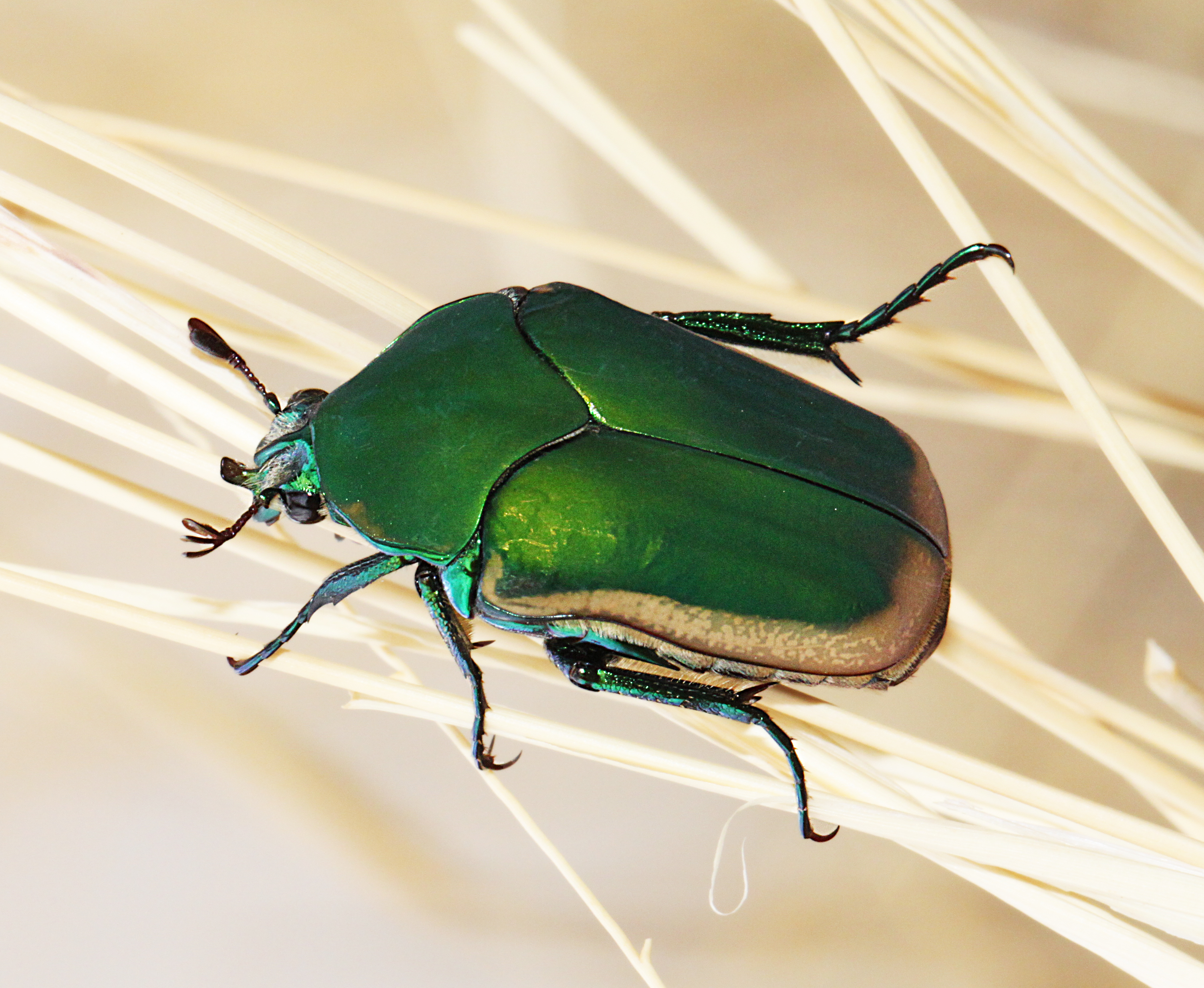
Representative image of the C. mutabilis clypeal horn on the left

Adult figeater beetles have green elytra and prothorax, along with a distinct clypeal horn. There are considerable variations in the shape of the clypeal horns among figeater beetles, with its overall shape ranging from wide with a pointed or blunt tip. The elytra lack costae ridges, giving them a smooth and plain appearance. The abdominal segments reveal the sex of the figeater beetle. Sex can be determined by analyzing abdominal segments, which are covered in hairs in females but are smooth in males. Within the same population, female figeater beetles exhibit larger sizes than male figeater beetles.

== Taxonomy ==
C. mutabilis is often confused with the green June beetle (Cotinis nitida). Both are members of the flower beetle subfamily (Cetoniinae), and are similar in appearance, but the green June beetle is smaller, and its range is in the Eastern United States. They are also occasionally mistaken for Japanese beetles (Popillia japonica), which also occur in the Eastern U.S.

Taxonomic research conducted between 1833 and 1915 described 31 taxa that are no longer considered separate species. C. mutabilis has the widest geographical range out of any species in the genus. Many of these, such as C. texana Casey, C. abdominalis Casey, and C. arizonica Casey, are now considered synonyms of C. mutabilis, meaning they are no longer recognized as distinct subspecies but rather are variations of C. mutabilis.

== Diet ==
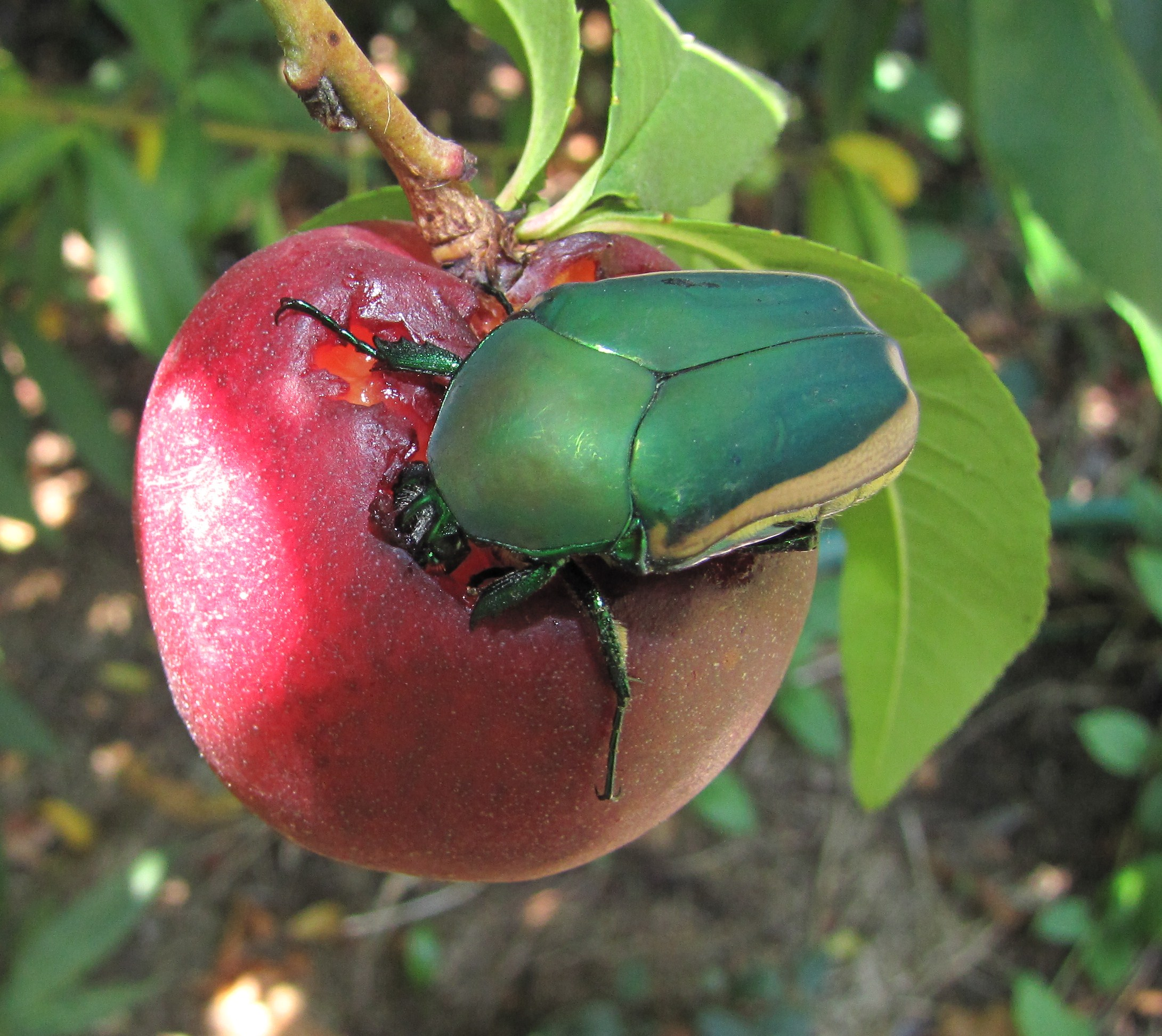
A figeater beetle eating a nectarine

The figeater beetle is native to wetter areas of the American Southwest, where its natural diet includes fruit from cacti and sap from desert trees. Their range has expanded considerably since the 1960s with the increasing availability of home gardens, compost piles, and organic mulch. The larvae are detritivores. and are found eating decomposing organic matter, such as that found in compost piles, manure piles, and organic mulch, and occasionally plant roots, such as the roots of grass in lawns. Adult figeater beetles have been recorded entering and visiting the detritus of Atta mexicana ants.

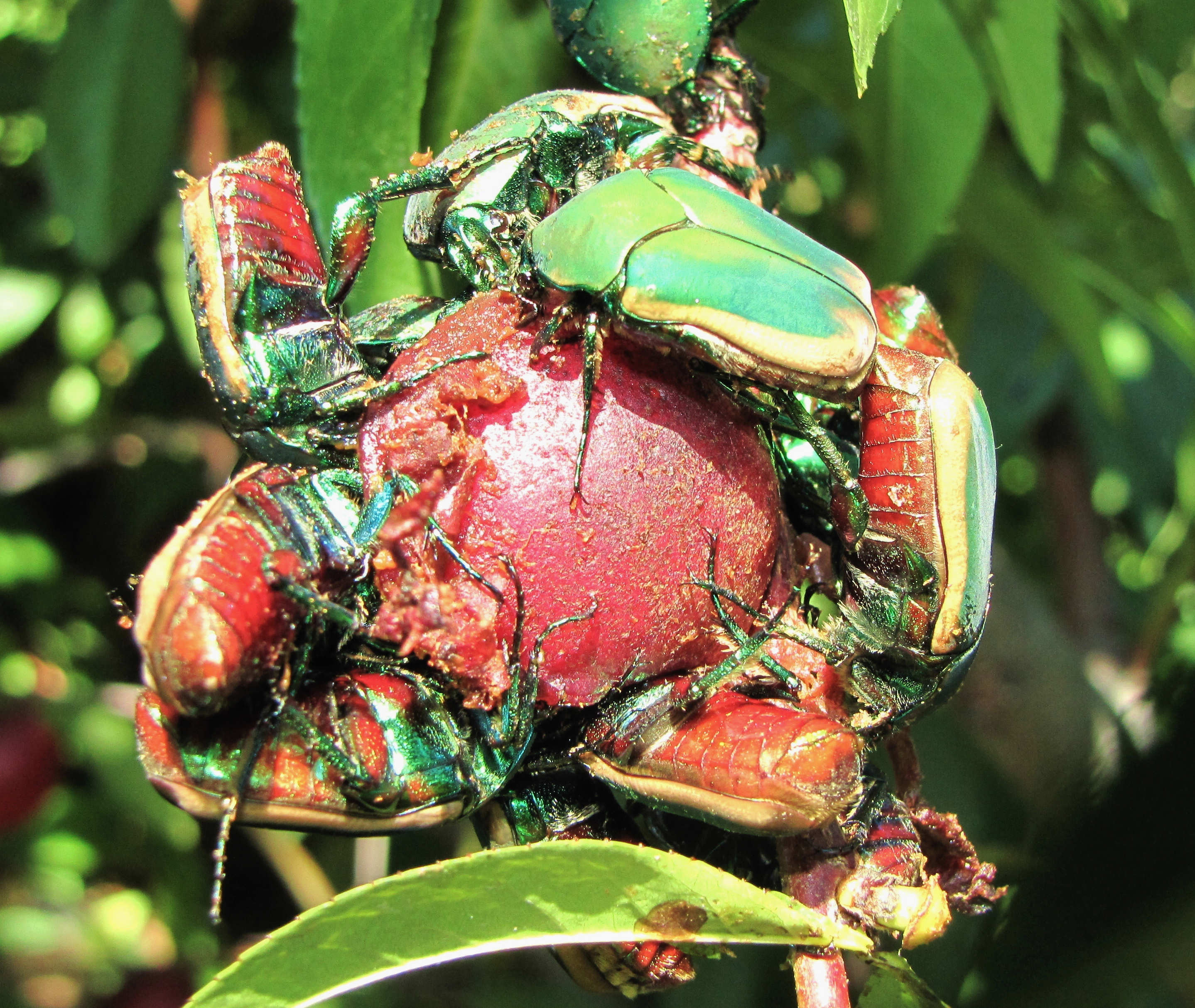
Figeater beetles clustering on a single fruit while foraging

The adult's primary food has become fruit in gardens and orchards. Figeater beetles have been observed on desert broom (Baccharis sarothroides) in southeastern Arizona, broom snakeweed (Gutierrezia sarothrae) in west Texas, and seep willow (Baccharis salicifolia) in southern Nevada. Figeater beetles are melliphagous and prefer sweet food sources and are observed on flowers and ripe fruit. Figeater beetle mandibles are not strong enough to break through the intact skin of thicker fruits, so they most often eat softer-skinned fruit such as figs, peaches, grapes, pears, and tomatoes. When unable to find pre-damaged fruit, figeater beetles use their clypeal horn on their heads to tear the skin and reach the flesh beneath. Because of this, figeater beetles search for pre-damaged fruits caused by birds, bats, or other insects such as Japanese beetles (Popillia japonica) to provide easier access to thicker skinned fruits like guavas, soursop, apples, plums, mangos, and apricots. The beetles are particularly attracted to ripening and fermenting fruit, which emit gases that lead the beetles to them.

In most small gardens, the adult beetles are minor pests that do little damage, but they can swarm on soft or damaged fruit and have been known to eat an entire garden grape or fig crop. Adults are diurnal and forage throughout the day, but foraging peaks in the early morning. While foraging, many figeater beetles have been observed clustering onto a single ripe fruit. They are not considered to be an important pest because they do not damage lawns as larvae and trees as much as June beetles or Japanese beetles. Although not currently a major pest, figeater beetles may raise future concerns for agriculture.

== Habitat and distribution ==
Distribution of C. mutabilis ranges from the U.S. to northern South America and has been recorded in almost all of Mexico. Figeater beetles occupy a wide range of habitat types, which include urban landscapes, tropical rainforests, cloud forests, and oak forests, at elevations spanning up to 2,700 meters above sea level.In Guerrero, Mexico, figeater beetles found at elevations reaching 840 and 1,600 meters above sea level have been observed on marigold flowers (Tagetes erecta). Agriculture enhances habitat for both life stages, providing fruit trees and orchards for adults and mulch, compost, composting manure, and material beneath haystacks for larval development. Figeater beetles have geographically expanded northward in recent decades. The first recording of figeater beetles in Nevada was in 1967. The first recording in Utah was in 2009, and the first recording in Colorado was in 2012. Expansion has been associated with climate change and agricultural activity, which have created suitable new habitats for the figeater. In Arizona, the increasing use of irrigation in agriculture has created favorable moist soil breeding conditions, leading to an increase of figeater beetle populations. As figeater habitats expand, they can have positive effects on vegetation by acting as possible pollinators. However, figeater beetles may pose an economic risk to farmers by damaging fruit crops.

== Thermoregulation ==
Unlike most beetles, figeater beetles are endothermic and are able to generate heat through the metabolic activity of their flight muscles. Even when resting and not in direct contact with the sun, figeater beetles are able to keep their thoracic temperatures up to 12 degrees Celsius warmer than the surrounding air. Their thoracic temperature can reach between 32-39 degrees Celsius before flight and, during flight, can range from 30-42 degrees Celsius. Figeater beetles have also been observed basking in the sun, which can increase their thoracic temperatures by 7-10 degrees Celsius.

== Phoresis ==
Figeater beetles interact with other species as a host in a phoretic relationship with the pseudoscorpion species Lustrochernes minor. The first recorded phoretic association between C. mutabilis and L. minor was in Oaxaca, Mexico, in 2019. The L. minor pseudoscorpions participate in passive phoresy, meaning they do not grab onto the figeater beetle but instead sit beneath the figeater beetle's elytra. The commensal relationship benefits the pseudoscorpions by allowing them to travel distances they would be unable to travel by themselves. The exact mechanisms of how pseudoscorpions get under the elytra are still unknown, but it is hypothesized that the pseudoscorpions living in soil may have encountered adult figeater beetles as they emerge from the ground after pupation.

== Natural enemies ==
A significant natural enemy is the fungus Metarrhizium anisophiae, which targets larvae during the third instar. When fungus completely takes over their body, killing the larvae and leaving their body hardened and white.A juvenile Mississippi kite (Ictinia mississippiensis) was observed repeatedly capturing and eating figeater beetles, sometimes in flight, in Imperial Beach, San Diego County, California, from September 6–9, 2006

== Environmental interaction ==
Figeater beetles have been utilized as a reliable bioindicator to monitor soil arsenic levels. Larvae feed underground, subjecting them to arsenic contaminated soil. This makes them particularly susceptible to accumulating arsenic over time. High soil arsenic levels are positively correlated with the high arsenic levels measured within figeater beetle bodies.

== Flight muscles ==
Figeater beetles have asynchronous flight muscles, allowing the wings to beat at higher frequencies without having to send a new nerve impulse after each contraction, which is characteristic of synchronous muscles. Before flight, a nerve signal activates the flight muscles, causing an initial contraction. This contraction then moves the wings in an oscillatory manner and is sustained by the wings and thorax, rather than the input of a new neural input. This allows figeater beetles to spend less energy during flight by reducing the energy expenditure required to activate their flight muscles. When figeater beetles fly, their wings move at approximately 90 cycles per second. The measured respiratory quotient of the figeater beetle's flight muscles is 0.83, which indicates that figeater beetles do not rely exclusively on either carbohydrates or pure fat as their primary energy sources for flight. The respiratory quotient of their flight muscles closely resembles that of the metabolic pathway that converts proline to alanine, although it has not been directly determined.

== Structure and coloration ==
Figeater beetles have a glossy, metallic iridescence that is attributed to light-reflecting structures within the cuticle. Three structural layers make up the cuticle. The layers consist of the outermost epicuticle, a middle exocuticle, and an innermost endocuticle. The outer exocuticle contains helicoidal fibrous chitin protein lamellae called Bouligand structures, which gives figeater beetles the iridescent and metallic shine by selectively reflecting left-handed polarized light.

Measured across multiple figeater beetles, epicuticle thickness is approximately 70-89 nanometers, while the outer exocuticle is thicker, roughly 6.6-9.2 micrometers across individuals. Individual beetles vary in color and commonly appear green, yellowish, or reddish. Color also differs between dorsal and ventral sides, where the dorsal side is typically not shiny, but the ventral side is shiny and metallic. These color variations come from variations in how tightly the chitin fibrils are wound, which is a property of cuticle pitch. The pitch is quantified by the distance it takes to complete one helical turn, and variations in pitch across different cuticle layers determine the color.

Another contributing factor to the figeater beetle's perceived color is the angles at which light hits the cuticle. Perceived color shifts depending on the angle at which the cuticle is viewed. The same beetle may shift from red to green when viewed from different side angles. When longer pitch yellowish cuticles are scratched, exposing the shorter pitch inner layer, the cuticle displays a greenish color. This phenomenon is due to pitch differences, which differ depending on the depth they are located within the cuticle, which reflect different wavelengths of light.

Genetic polymorphism has historically led researchers to describe the same species under different taxonomic names. Different color variations are more prominent in different regions. In central Mexico, distinctly green and black variations are found in the same geographical area without producing offspring with intermediate appearances.

== Cultural significance ==
Figeater beetle legs have been used in jewelry production by humans during the early Basketmaker II society and were worn to display high social status. Two necklaces constructed using the legs of figeater beetles have been recovered from the Bears Ears National Monument in Utah and have been dated to approximately 70-60 BCE.
