= Mount Bosnek =

Ice-covered peak in Graham Land

Location of Oscar II Coast on Antarctic Peninsula.

Mount Bosnek (Bulgarian: връх Боснек, romanized: vrah Bosnek, IPA: [ˈvrɤɣ bosˈnɛk]) is the ice-covered peak rising to 1,515 metres (4,970 ft) in the west part of Voden Heights on Oscar II Coast in Graham Land. It is situated between two southeastwards flowing tributaries to Fleece Glacier. The feature is named after the settlement of Bosnek in Western Bulgaria.

== Location ==
Mount Bosnek is located at 65°50′39″S 63°13′17″W, which is 4.04 km south of Mount Zadruga, 30.53 km west of Peleg Peak, 9 km north of Moider Peak, and 18.6 km northeast of Kyulevcha Nunatak. British mapping in 1976.

== Maps ==
- British Antarctic Territory. Scale 1:200000 topographic map. DOS 610 Series, Sheet W 65 62. Directorate of Overseas Surveys, Tolworth, UK, 1976.
- Antarctic Digital Database (ADD). Scale 1:250000 topographic map of Antarctica. Scientific Committee on Antarctic Research (SCAR). Since 1993, regularly upgraded and updated.
