= Pamidovo Nunatak =

Nunatak in Graham Land, Antarctica

Location of Oscar II Coast on Antarctic Peninsula.

Pamidovo Nunatak (Bulgarian: нунатак Памидово, ‘Nunatak Pamidovo’ \'nu-na-tak pa-'mi-do-vo\) is the rocky ridge extending 4.42 km in west-southwest to east-northeast direction, 1.18 km wide, and rising to 1156 m in Voden Heights on Oscar II Coast in Graham Land. It surmounts Fleece Glacier to the southwest. Named after the settlement of Pomodoro in Southern Bulgaria.

== Location ==
Pamidovo Nunatak is located at 65°52′17″S 62°59′31″W, which is 8.15 km southeast of Mount Izvor, 8.46 km west-northwest of Adit Nunatak, and 10.05 km northeast of Moider Peak. British mapping in 1976.

== Maps ==
- British Antarctic Territory. Scale 1:200000 topographic map. DOS 610 Series, Sheet W 65 62. Directorate of Overseas Surveys, Tolworth, UK, 1976.
- Antarctic Digital Database (ADD). Scale 1:250000 topographic map of Antarctica. Scientific Committee on Antarctic Research (SCAR). Since 1993, regularly upgraded and updated.
