= Mount Izvor =

Mountain peak in Antarctica

Location of Oscar II Coast on Antarctic Peninsula.

Mount Izvor (Bulgarian: връх Извор, romanized: vrah Izvor, IPA: [ˈvrɤx izˈvɔr]) is the mostly ice-covered peak rising to 1646 m in the west part of Voden Heights on Oscar II Coast in Graham Land. It surmounts a tributary to Fleece Glacier to the southwest. The feature is named after the settlements of Izvor in Southeastern, Southern, Western and Northwestern Bulgaria.

== Location ==
Mount Izvor is located at 65°50′11″S 63°08′55″W, which is 4.4 km southeast of Mount Zadruga, 8.15 km northwest of Pamidovo Nunatak, and 3.4 km east-northeast of Mount Bosnek. British mapping in 1976.

== Maps ==
- British Antarctic Territory. Scale 1:200000 topographic map. DOS 610 Series, Sheet W 65 62. Directorate of Overseas Surveys, Tolworth, UK, 1976.
- Antarctic Digital Database (ADD). Scale 1:250000 topographic map of Antarctica. Scientific Committee on Antarctic Research (SCAR). Since 1993, regularly upgraded and updated.
