= Koledari Knoll =

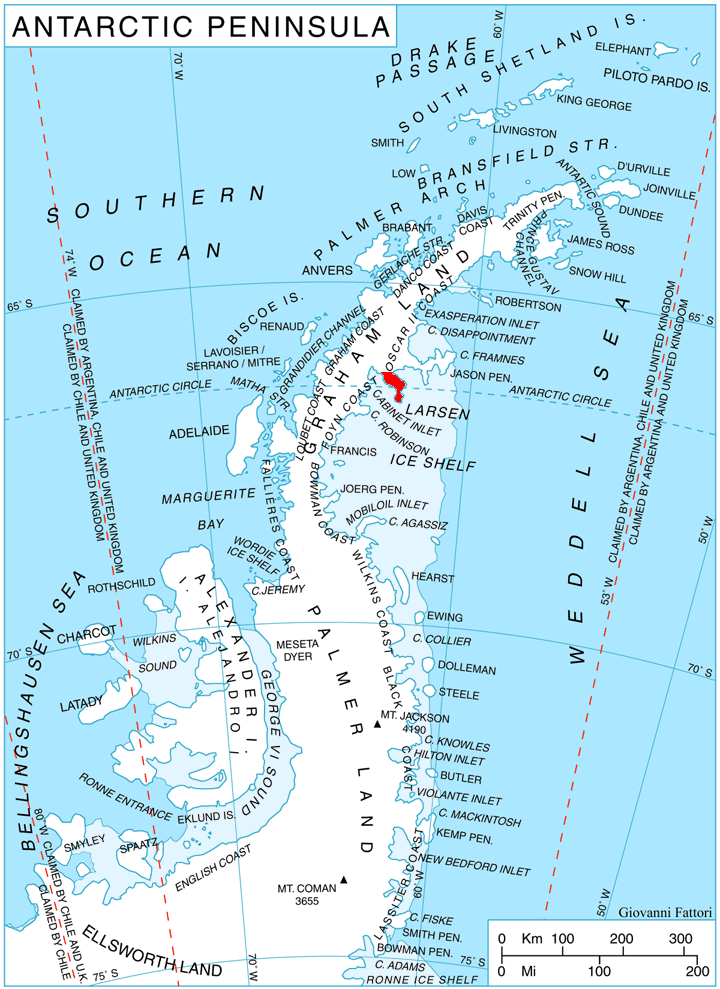
Location of Churchill Peninsula in Graham Land, Antarctic Peninsula.

Koledari Knoll (Bulgarian: Коледарска могила, ‘Koledarska Mogila’ \ko-le-'dar-ska mo'gi-la\) is the rocky ridge extending 1 km in north-northwest to south-southeast direction, 320 m wide, and rising to 375 m on Foyn Coast in Graham Land. It is situated in the north part of Churchill Peninsula, overlooking Adie Inlet to the northeast and Scar Inlet to the southwest. The feature is named after the Bulgarian folkloric ritual of ‘Koledari.’

== Location ==
Koledari Knoll is located at 66°22′59″S 62°54′58″W, which is 12.8 km southeast of Swift Peak, 17.9 km south of Filip Totyu Nunatak, and 20.9 km northwest of Slav Point. British mapping in 1974.

== Maps ==
- British Antarctic Territory: Graham Land. Scale 1:250000 topographic map. BAS 250 Series, Sheet SQ 19-20. London, 1974.
- Antarctic Digital Database (ADD). Scale 1:250000 topographic map of Antarctica. Scientific Committee on Antarctic Research (SCAR). Since 1993, regularly upgraded and updated.
