= Lilliput =

Lilliput may refer to:

== Geography ==
- Lilliput (townland), a townland in County Westmeath, Ireland
- Lilliput, Dorset, a district in the town of Poole in Dorset, United Kingdom
- Lilliput Glacier, the smallest named glacier in the Sierra Nevada of California
- Lilliput Mountain, a mountain on the British Columbia-Alberta border in the Canadian Rockies
- Lilliput Nunataks, three nunataks on the eastern side of Graham Land, Antarctica
- Lilliput, Victoria, a parish in the County of Bogong, Victoria, Australia

== Art, entertainment, and media ==
- Lilliput and Blefuscu, two island nations in Jonathan Swift's novel Gulliver's Travels (1726, amended 1735)

=== Publications ===
- Lilliput (magazine), a British art and literature magazine
- Lilliput (play), 1756 play by David Garrick

== Brands and enterprises ==
- Lilliput Lane, British company miniature models of English cottages and scenes
- Lilliput Kidswear, Indian clothing company

== Other uses ==
- Lilliput (actor), actor and writer in Indian TV and film
- Lilliput effect, an effect where taxa show a decrease in body size after an extinction event
- Operation Lilliput, part of the Allied offensive in Papua in World War II
- Lilliput, is a tiny island kingdom in Gulliver's Travels
- Lilliput, a genus of jumping spiders that was renamed to Tanzania in 2008
- Lilliput longarm octopus a small species of octopus, scientific name Macrotritopus Defilippi
- Lilliput library, a form of public bookcase found in New Zealand

== See also ==
- Gulliver's Travels
- Liliput (disambiguation)
