= Kyulevcha Nunatak =

Nunatak in Graham Land, Antarctica

Location of Oscar II Coast on Antarctic Peninsula.

Kyulevcha Nunatak (Bulgarian: нунатак Кюлевча, ‘Nunatak Kyulevcha’ \'nu-na-tak kyu-'lev-cha\) is the rocky, partly ice-free ridge extending 4.17 km in northwest–southeast direction, 1.2 km wide, and rising to 1740 m between the upper courses of Fleece Glacier and Leppard Glacier on Oscar II Coast in Graham Land. The feature is named after the settlement of Kyulevcha in Northeastern Bulgaria.

== Location ==
Kyulevcha Nunatak is located at 65°57′45″S 63°30′33″W, which is 5.9 km west-southwest of Moider Peak, 10.65 km west-northwest of Mount Lagado, and 37 km east of Mount Dewey on Graham Coast. British mapping in 1976.

== Maps ==
- British Antarctic Territory. Scale 1:200000 topographic map. DOS 610 Series, Sheet W 65 62. Directorate of Overseas Surveys, Tolworth, UK, 1976.
- Antarctic Digital Database (ADD). Scale 1:250000 topographic map of Antarctica. Scientific Committee on Antarctic Research (SCAR), 1993–2016.
