= Krali Marko Crag =

Location of Oscar II Coast on Antarctic Peninsula.

Krali Marko Crag (Bulgarian: Крали Марков камък, romanized: Krali Markov kamak; Bulgarian pronunciation: [krali markɔv kamɤk]) is the rocky ridge extending 6.45 km in west-southwest to east-northeast direction, 1.57 km wide, and rising to 851 m in the east part of Voden Heights on Oscar II Coast in Graham Land. It surmounts Scar Inlet to the east. The feature is named after the settlement of Krali Marko in Southern Bulgaria.

== Location ==
Krali Marko Crag is located at 65°51′57″S 62°30′36″W, which is 3.4 km southeast of Peleg Peak, 8.46 km southwest of Spouter Peak, 4.94 km west-northwest of Ishmael Peak, and 5.15 km northeast of Marsh Spur. British mapping in 1976.

== Maps ==
- British Antarctic Territory. Scale 1:200000 topographic map. DOS 610 Series, Sheet W 65 62. Directorate of Overseas Surveys, Tolworth, UK, 1976.
- Antarctic Digital Database (ADD). Scale 1:250000 topographic map of Antarctica. Scientific Committee on Antarctic Research (SCAR). Since 1993, regularly upgraded and updated.
