= Cavarus Point =

Point in Graham Land, Antarctica

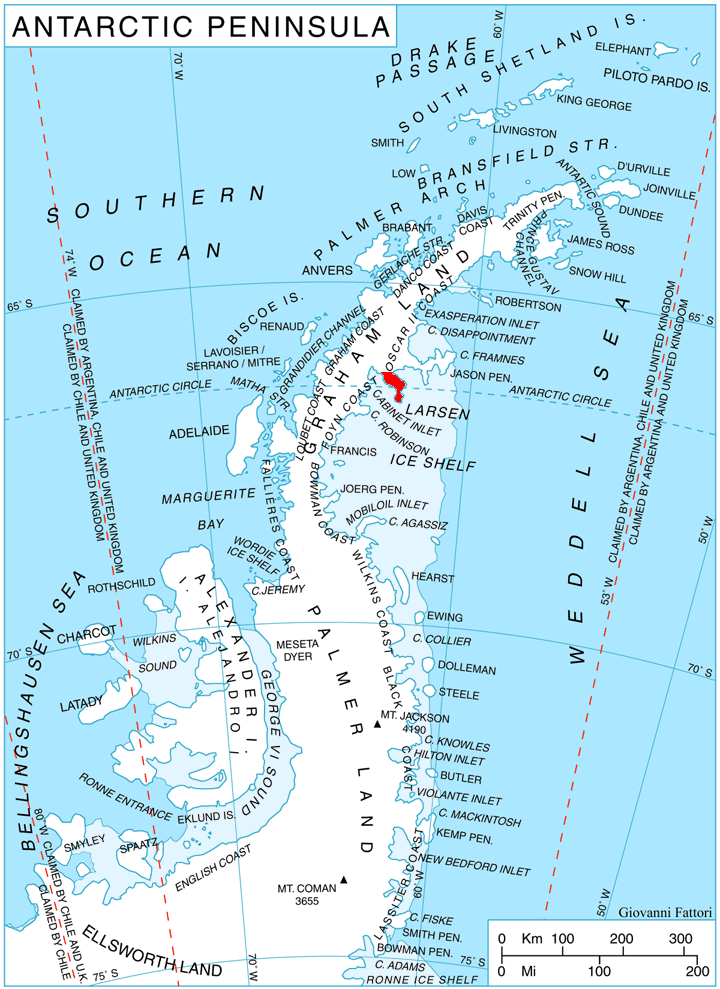
Location of Churchill Peninsula in Graham Land, Antarctic Peninsula

Cavarus Point (Bulgarian: нос Кавар, ‘Nos Kavar’ \'nos ka-'var\) is the mostly ice-covered point on the south side of the entrance to Zimen Inlet and the north side of the entrance to Brentopara Inlet on Oscar II Coast in Graham Land. It is situated on the east coast of Churchill Peninsula. The feature is named after King Cavarus, a Celtic ruler in Thrace (3rd century BC).

== Location ==
Cavarus Point is located at 66°35′43″S 62°31′25″W, which is 16.36 km north of Cape Alexander, 12.8 km south of Slav Point, and 36.48 km west-southwest of Veier Head on Jason Peninsula. British mapping in 1974.

== Maps ==
- British Antarctic Territory: Graham Land. Scale 1:250000 topographic map. BAS 250 Series, Sheet SQ 19-20. London, 1974.
- Antarctic Digital Database (ADD). Scale 1:250000 topographic map of Antarctica. Scientific Committee on Antarctic Research (SCAR). Since 1993, regularly upgraded and updated.
