= Filip Totyu Nunatak =

Nunatak in Graham Land, Antarctica

Location of Oscar II Coast on Antarctic Peninsula.

Filip Totyu Nunatak (Bulgarian: нунатак Филип Тотю, ‘Nunatak Filip Totyu’ \'nu-na-tak 'fi-lip 'to-tyu\) is the rocky ridge extending 3.9 km in north-south direction, 960 m wide, with twin heights rising to 656 m (northern one) and 627 m (southern one) on Oscar II Coast in Graham Land. It overlooks Adie Inlet to the southeast. The feature is named after Filip Totyu (Todor Stanchev, 1830-1907), a leader of the Bulgarian liberation movement, in connection with the settlement Filip Totevo in Northern Bulgaria.

== Location ==
Filip Totyu Nunatak is located at 66°13′31″S 62°55′03″W, which is 29.78 km southeast of Mount Lagado, 10.36 km west-southwest of Gulliver Nunatak, and 11.1 km northeast of Swift Peak. British mapping in 1974.

== Maps ==
- British Antarctic Territory: Graham Land. Scale 1:250000 topographic map. BAS 250 Series, Sheet SQ 19-20. London, 1974.
- Antarctic Digital Database (ADD). Scale 1:250000 topographic map of Antarctica. Scientific Committee on Antarctic Research (SCAR). Since 1993, regularly upgraded and updated.
