= Liliput =

Liliput may refer to:

- LiLiPUT, a Swiss band
- Liliput pistol, a tiny 4.25 mm pistol or its 4.25mm Liliput cartridge
- Prater Liliputbahn, a 381 mm gauge railway in the park Prater in Vienna
- A misspelling of Lilliput, a fictional location from Gulliver's Travels inhabited by tiny people

== See also ==
- Lilliput (disambiguation)
