= Krali =

Krali may refer to

- Krali Bimbalov (1934–1988), Bulgarian wrestler
- Krali Marko Crag, a rocky ridge in Antarctica
- Krali Marko, Pazardzhik Province, a village in southern Bulgaria
- Kapıcılar Kralı (King of Housekeepers), a 1976 Turkish comedy film
- Amphimallon krali a species of beetle
