= Kolibri Pistol =

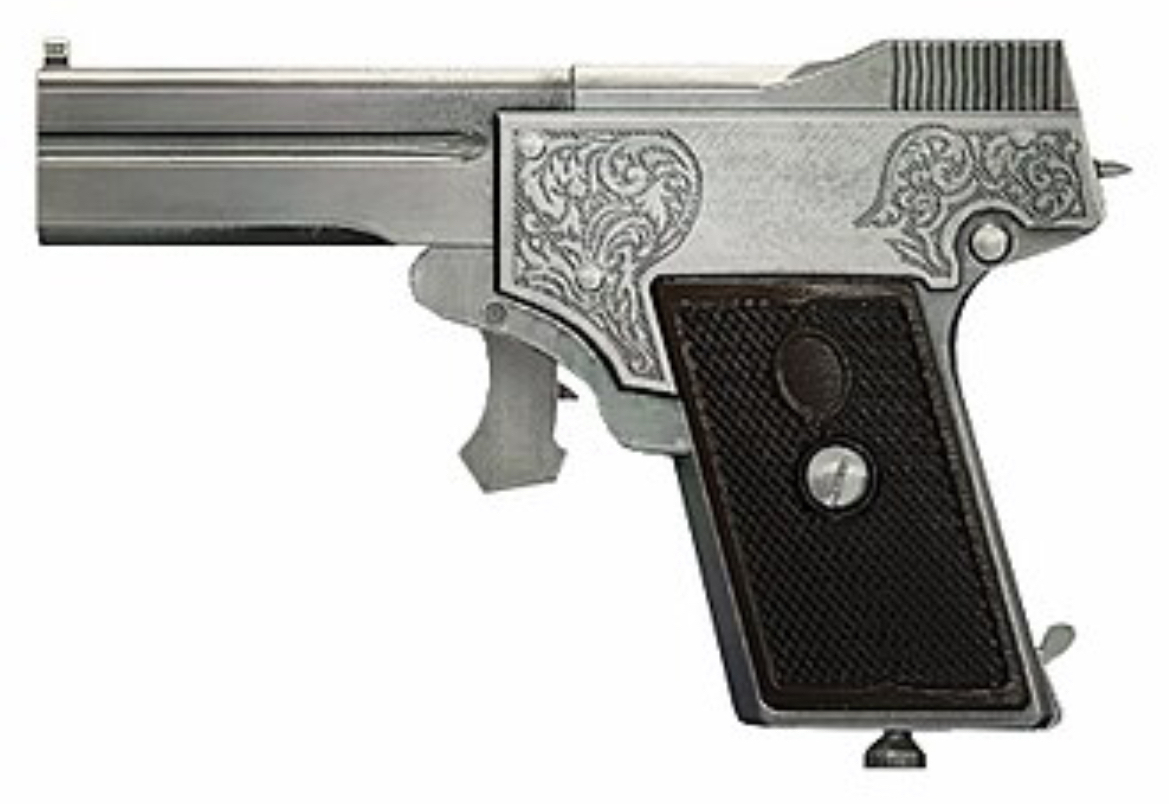
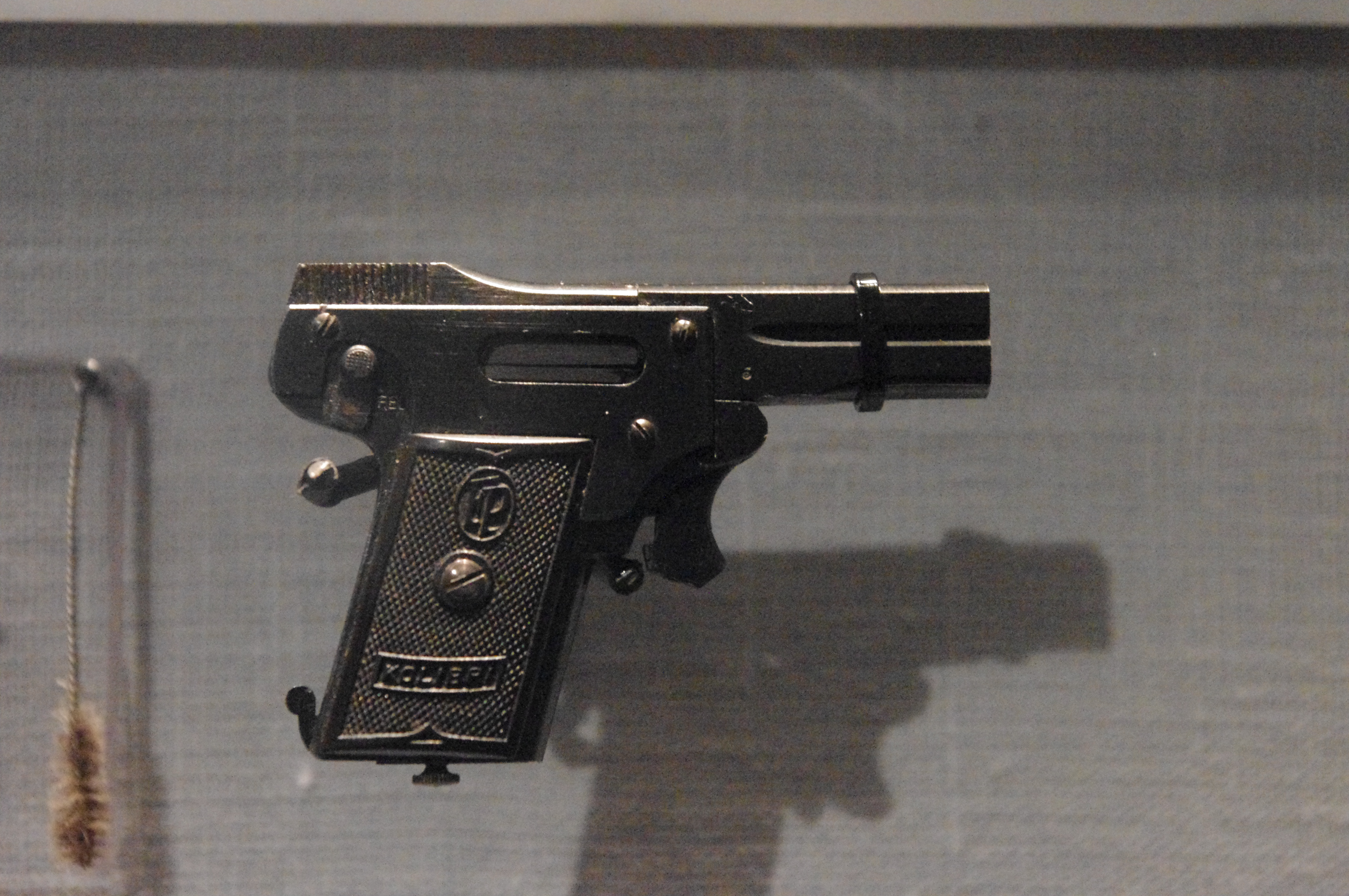
- Type: Semi-automatic pistol
- Place of origin: Austria-Hungary

Production history
- Designer: Franz Pfannl; Georg Grabner
- Manufacturer: Georg Grabner
- Produced: 1914-1920s
- No. built: about 3,500

Specifications
- Mass: 220 g (0.49 lb)
- Length: 65 mm (2.56 in); 70 mm (2.76 in)
- Barrel length: 30 mm (1.18 in); 35 mm (1.38 in)
- Cartridge: 2.7 mm Kolibri; 3 mm Kolibri
- Caliber: 2.7 mm 3.0 mm
- Action: Blowback
- Feed system: 5 or 6 rounds magazine
- Sights: fixed

The Kolibri pistol is a semi-automatic handgun designed and produced in Austria (initially the Austro-Hungarian Empire) by Georg Grabner and Franz Pfannl. The name is derived from Kolibri, the German word for hummingbird, which is among the smallest of birds.

== Design and development ==
Based on Franz Pfannl's Erika Pistol, the Kolibri pistol was launched in 1914, as Georg Grabner wanted to create a personal defense weapon for women. Although Grabner is credited as the creator of the Kolibri, it was actually Pfannl's own design. The pistol was offered in two calibers: 2.7mm and 3mm, both versions manufactured with a smoothbore barrel, a safety on the left side of the weapon, and a reciprocating locking system. The 3mm caliber version, besides being rarer, had a slightly shorter barrel than its 2.7mm variant; however, the difference was minimal.

The Kolibri pistol is considered the world's smallest semi-automatic pistol; however, the Guinness Book of World Records recognizes the pistol manufactured by the Argentine Carlos Alberto Balbiani as the world's smallest pistol, and the Swiss Mini Gun C1ST as the world's smallest revolver—though Balbiani's pistol lacks semi-automatic capability, and there are fundamental differences between revolvers and semi-automatic pistols.
