= Target Hill =

Hill in Antarctica

Target Hill (66°0′S 62°57′W) is a prominent hill which rises 1,010 m above the level of Larsen Ice Shelf. It stands 6 nautical miles (11 km) west of Mount Fritsche on the south flank of Leppard Glacier in eastern Graham Land. The hill was the most westerly point reached by the Falkland Islands Dependencies Survey (FIDS) survey party in 1955; it was visible to the party as a target upon which to steer from the summit of Richthofen Pass.
