= Brentopara Inlet =

Body of water in Graham Land, Antarctica

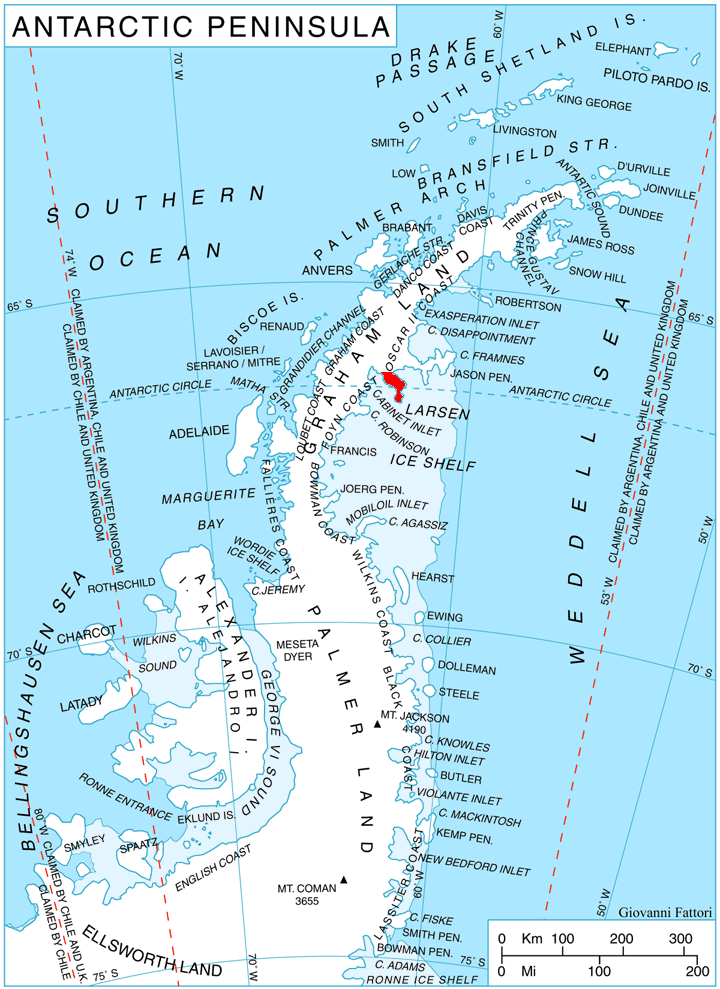
Location of Churchill Peninsula in Graham Land, Antarctic Peninsula.

Brentopara Inlet (Bulgarian: залив Брентопара, ‘Zaliv Brentopara’ \'za-liv bren-to-'pa-ra\) is the 7 km wide inlet indenting for 6.2 km the east coast of Churchill Peninsula, Oscar II Coast in Graham Land. It is part of Adie Inlet entered southeast of Cavarus Point and northwest of Astro Cliffs. The feature is named after the ancient Thracian town of Brentopara in Southern Bulgaria.

== Location ==
Brentopara Inlet is located at 66°38′30″S 62°31′30″W. British mapping in 1974.

== Maps ==
- British Antarctic Territory: Graham Land. Scale 1:250000 topographic map. BAS 250 Series, Sheet SQ 19-20. London, 1974.
- Antarctic Digital Database (ADD). Scale 1:250000 topographic map of Antarctica. Scientific Committee on Antarctic Research (SCAR). Since 1993, regularly upgraded and updated.
