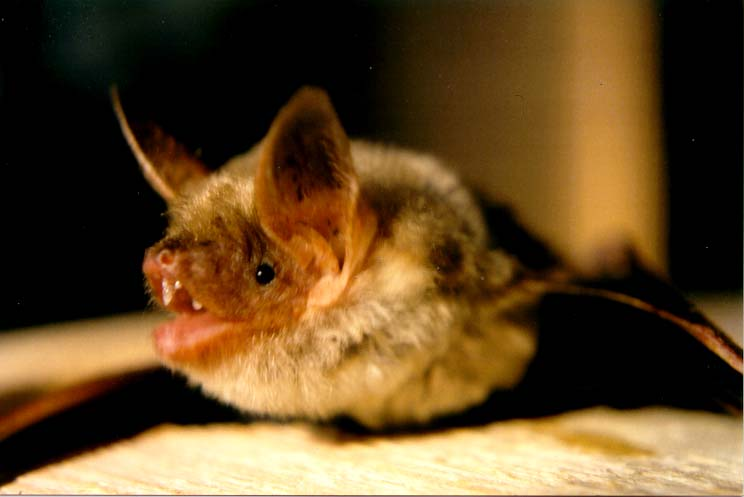

Conservation status
- Least Concern (IUCN 3.1)

Scientific classification
- Kingdom: Animalia
- Phylum: Chordata
- Class: Mammalia
- Order: Chiroptera
- Family: Vespertilionidae
- Genus: Myotis
- Species: M. myotis

Binomial name
- Myotis myotis (Borkhausen, 1797)
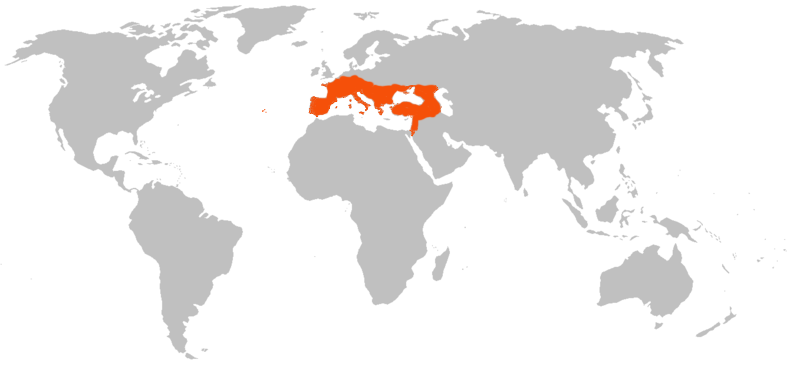
- Distribution

= Greater mouse-eared bat =

Species of bat

The greater mouse-eared bat (Myotis myotis) is a European species of bat in the family Vespertilionidae.

== Description ==
Myotis myotis is a large bat with a long, broad muzzle and big, long ears. The body's dorsal side is brown to reddish-brown, while the ventral side is dirty white or beige. The tragus forms half of the ear, with a small black tip in most individuals. Wing membranes are brownish in colour. The Greater mouse-eared bat is relatively large for a member of the genus Myotis, weighing up to 45 grams (1.6 oz) and measuring 8 to 9 cm from head to tail (a little larger than a house mouse, Mus musculus), making it one of the largest European bats. It has a 40 cm wingspan, with a forearm length of 6 cm, and a 4 to 5 cm long tail. Greater mouse-eared bat are exceptionally long-lived for their size, and can have lifespans of more than 35 years.

== Distribution ==
The greater mouse-eared bat can be found throughout Europe, with populations in most European countries except Ireland, Denmark, Latvia, Estonia, Finland and the Scandinavian Peninsula. It is also found on many Mediterranean islands, such as Sicily, Malta, and the Gymnesian Islands. In the Middle East, Myotis myotis has been found in Turkey, Israel, Syria, Jordan and Lebanon. It possibly lives in the United Kingdom.

In the Balearics, Myotis myotis can be found on the islands of Mallorca and Menorca. It is the most abundant species of bat on Mallorca, with several caves containing large colonies of 200, 400 and 500 individuals. It is also very common in the Iberian Peninsula and France.

During the 20th century, this species was very rare in Great Britain, occurring only in southern England. However, the bats at the only known hibernation roost declined until only a few males were left, and when these disappeared the species was believed locally extinct. However, occasional individuals have been discovered in recent years, suggesting either that a colony survives or that further animals have colonised Great Britain from mainland Europe.

In 2012, a LIFE-Nature project was initiated, aiming to protect the several thousands of greater mouse-eared bat in the Gola della Rossa and Frasassi Nature Park in the Marches.

== Behaviour ==
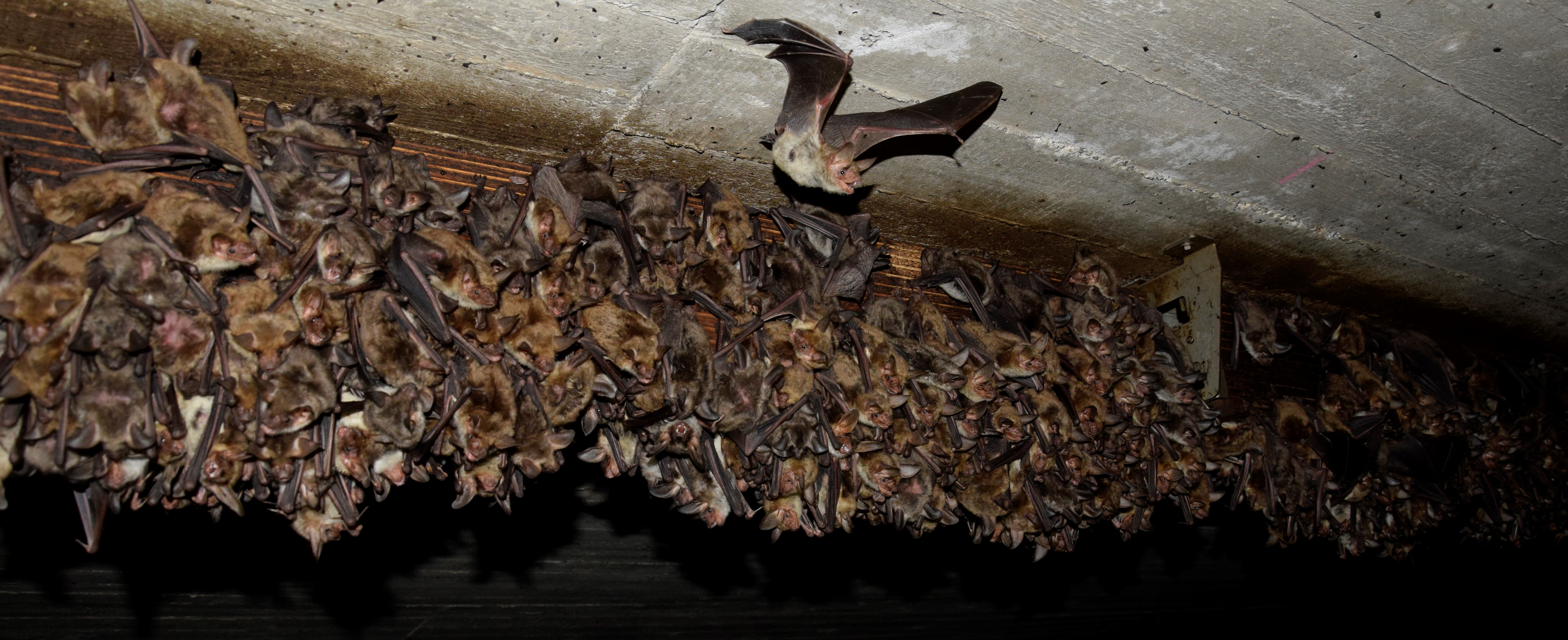
Greater mouse-eared bats in a nursery roost.

Like its relatives, the greater mouse-eared bat is an insectivore, feeding on various arthropods; however, unlike many bats, it does not capture its prey by using echolocation in flight. Instead, it gleans it from the ground, locating prey passively by listening for the noises produced by insects such as carabid beetles, grass beetles, other beetles and large moths, as well as centipedes and spiders. As a result, it uses echolocation only for spatial orientation, even if it emits ultrasound calls when approaching prey.

Myotis myotis forages in open deciduous woodlands, forest edges and pastures. It roosts underground throughout the year, although roosts in Northern Europe are also located in attics and lofts of buildings. More rarely, small tree-based colonies also occur. Colonies on Mediterranean islands such as Mallorca usually have up to 500 individuals, though colonies of over 4,500 bats have been found in continental Europe. It has been known to roost with other bats, such as Myotis capaccinii and Miniopterus schreibersi. In mainland Europe, Myotis myotis performs annual dispersions of up to 200 km in spring, although most are only of 10 km or so.

As with most vespertilionid bats, the greater mouse-eared bat exhibits slight sexual dimorphism, with females being slightly larger than males. Mating takes place in autumn, with females giving birth from May to June. Each female has 1–2 pups, which are carried around for about 45 days. During this period, females form nursery colonies from which males are excluded.

The frequencies used by this bat species for echolocation lie between 22 and 86 kHz, have most energy at 37 kHz and have an average duration of 6.0 ms.
