= Zimen Inlet =

Inlet in Antarctica

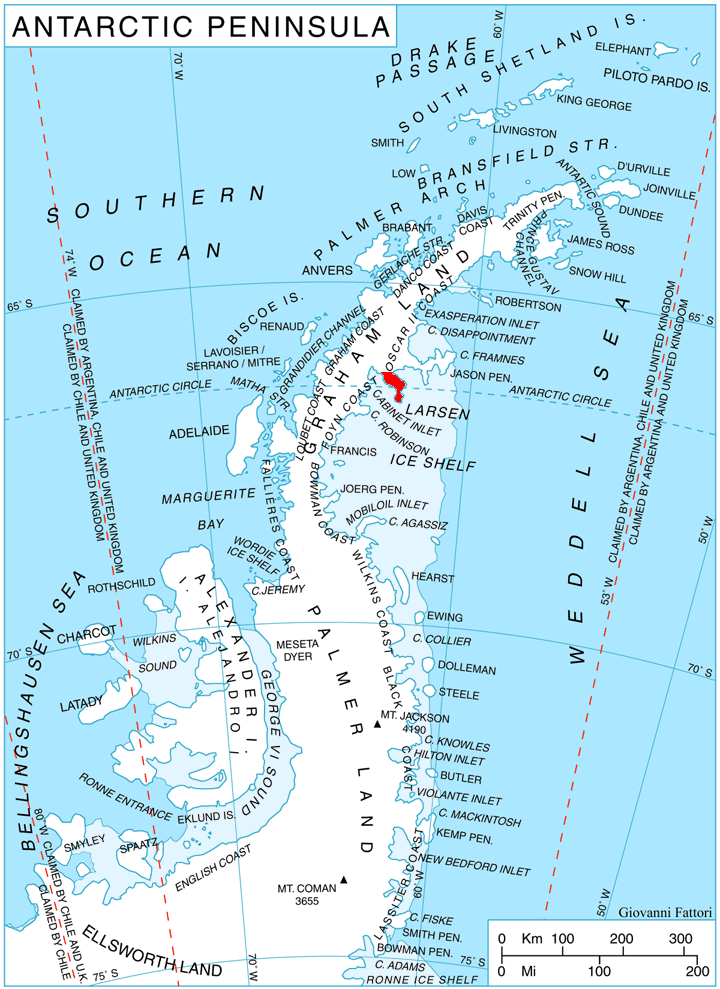
Location of Churchill Peninsula in Graham Land, Antarctic Peninsula.

Zimen Inlet (Bulgarian: Зименски залив, ‘Zimenski Zaliv’ \'zi-men-ski 'za-liv\) is the 12.8 km wide inlet indenting for 9.3 km the east coast of Churchill Peninsula, Oscar II Coast in Graham Land. It is part of Adie Inlet entered south of Slav Point and north of Cavarus Point. The feature is named after the settlement of Zimen in Southeastern Bulgaria.

== Location ==
Zimen Inlet is located at 66°33′00″S 62°37′00″W. British mapping in 1974.

== Maps ==
- British Antarctic Territory: Graham Land. Scale 1:250000 topographic map. BAS 250 Series, Sheet SQ 19–20. London, 1974.
- Antarctic Digital Database (ADD). Scale 1:250000 topographic map of Antarctica. Scientific Committee on Antarctic Research (SCAR), 1993–2016.
