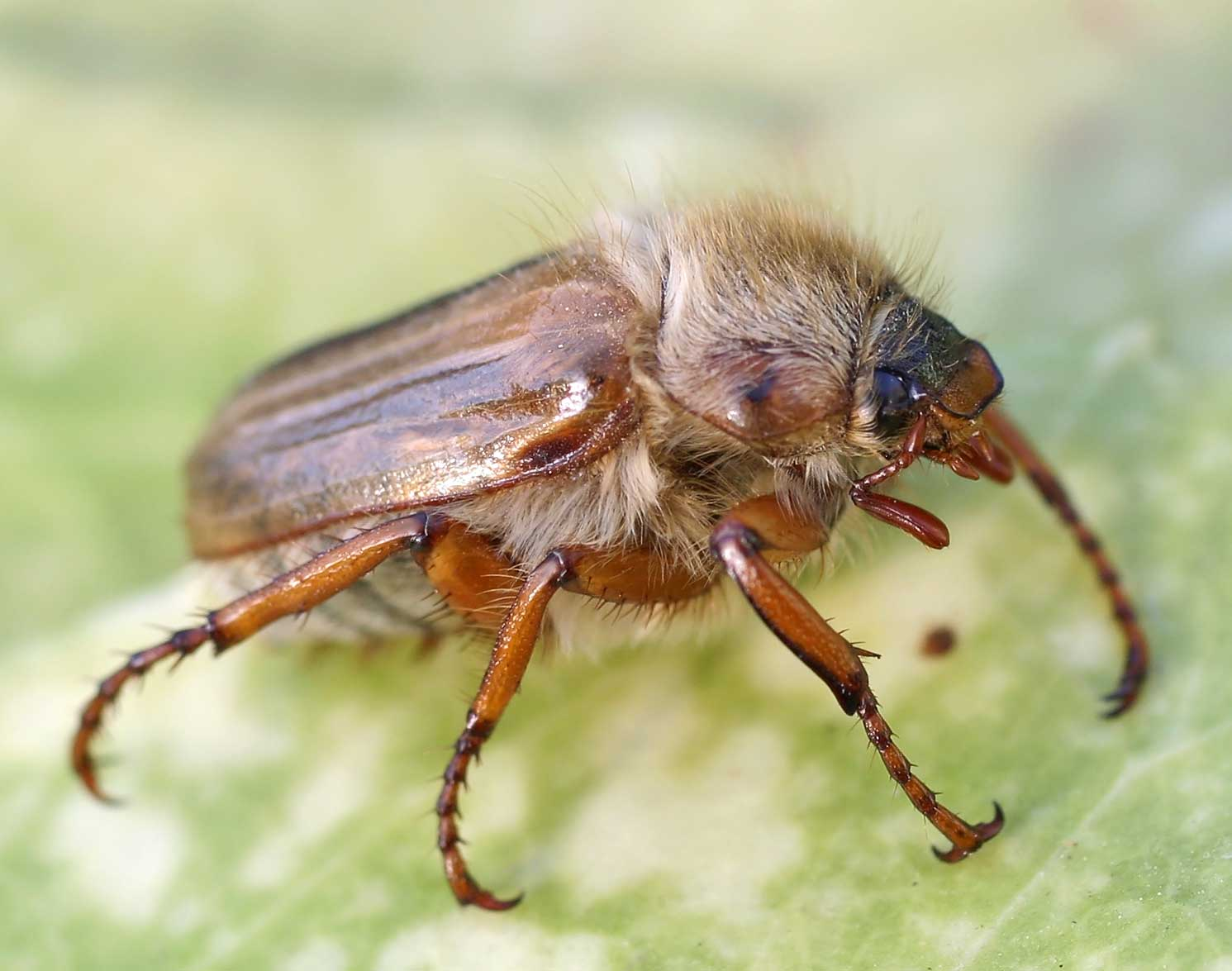

Scientific classification
- Kingdom: Animalia
- Phylum: Arthropoda
- Clade: Pancrustacea
- Class: Insecta
- Order: Coleoptera
- Suborder: Polyphaga
- Infraorder: Scarabaeiformia
- Family: Scarabaeidae
- Genus: Amphimallon
- Species: A. solstitiale

Binomial name
- Amphimallon solstitiale (Linnaeus, 1758)

= Amphimallon solstitiale =

Species of beetle

Amphimallon solstitiale, also known as the summer chafer or European june beetle, is a beetle similar to the cockchafer but much smaller, approximately 20 millimetres (0.79 in) in length. They are declining in numbers now, but where found they are often seen in large numbers. At dusk they actively fly around tree tops looking for a mate and can often be found drowning in pools of water the following morning. They are also attracted to light and come in through open, lit windows and fly around lamps, making quite a racket while bumping into lights. They are found throughout the Palearctic region (and North America) and, commonly seen from June to August, living in meadows, hedgerows, and gardens, and eating plants and tree foliage.

The larva of summer chafer undergo a two to three-year period of development underground, feeding upon host plants. Carabid beetles, such as Poecilus cupreus, hunt and consume larvae and serve as a primary predator in arable fields.

These June beetles act as root pests for a number of economically important crops including potatoes, rape, legumes, chestnuts, and turfgrass. As generalist herbivores, they primarily feed upon secondary roots with smaller amounts of anti-herbivore chemicals across many different species. Several chemical and bio-control agents have been developed to control their populations, including their endemic bacteria and entomopathogenic nematodes.

== Distribution ==
The species can be found throughout Europe, extending into Turkey and even occurring in portions of East Asia. A number of other species of Amphimallon have been synonymized with subspecies of A. solstitale, including A. ochraceum and A. irtishensis.
