= Liliput pistol =

Liliput 4.25 mm, 6.35 mm
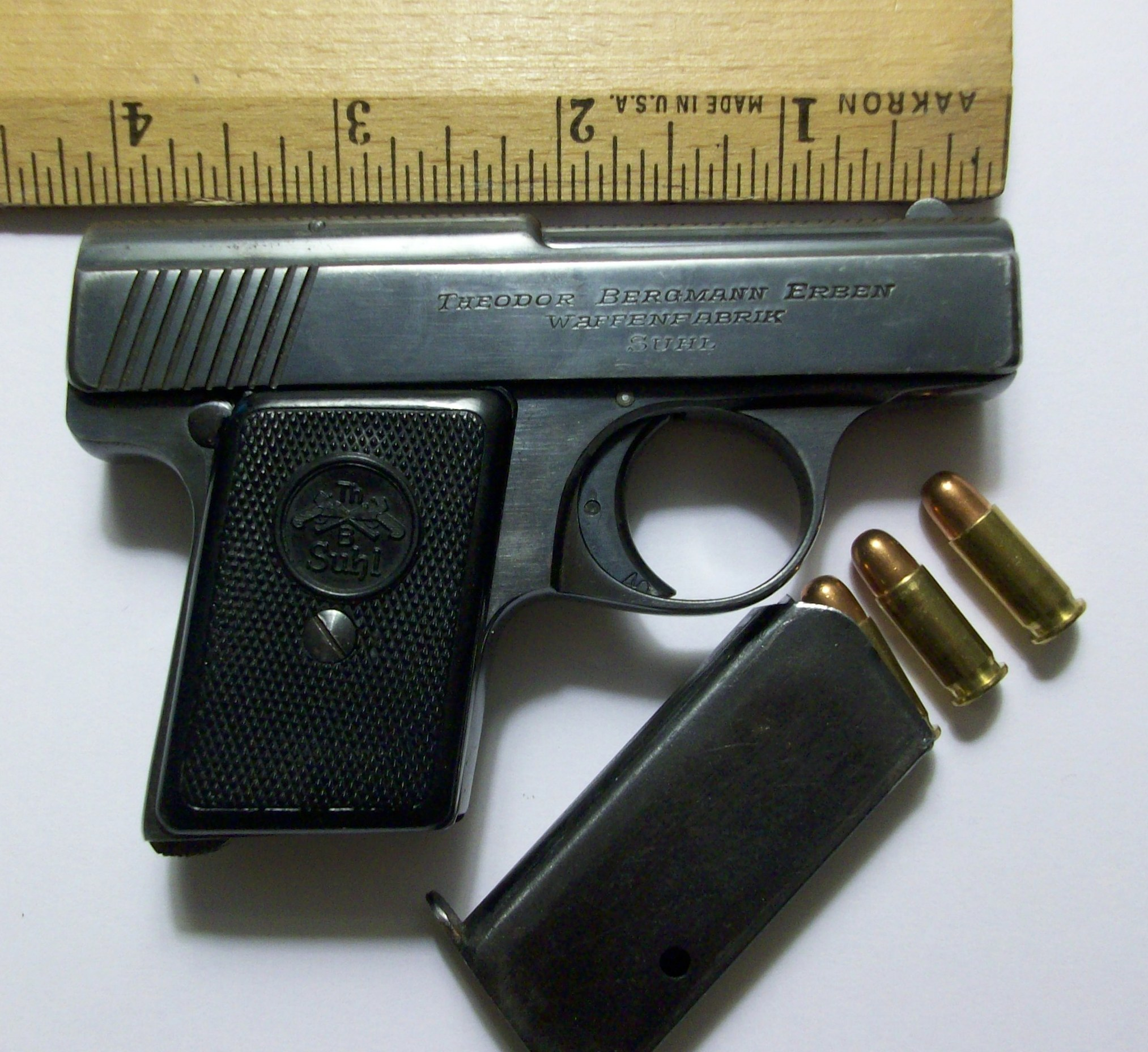
- Liliput Model I (.25 ACP)
- Type: Pistol
- Place of origin: Weimar Republic

Production history
- Manufacturer: August Menz
- Variants: 2

Specifications
- Cartridge: 4.25mm Liliput, .25 ACP, .32 ACP
- Caliber: 4.25 mm (.167 in), .25 in (6.35 mm)
- Action: Blowback

Designed and popularized by the Austrian watchmaker Franz Pfannl. The 4.25 mm Liliput pistol is one of the smallest semiautomatic handguns ever made (the Kolibri is generally considered the smallest). Hence its name, derived from the fictional island of Lilliput, inhabited by tiny people. The pistol is a simple blowback with an unlocked breach. It uses a 4.25 mm (.167 in) rimless centerfire straight-sided cartridge (which became known as the 4.25mm Liliput, and which is no longer manufactured), that was introduced with the Erika 4.25mm handgun. Overall length of the Liliput was 4.25 inches and barrel length was 1 3/4 inches.

The Liliput was manufactured by Waffenfabrik August Menz in Suhl, Germany, from approximately 1920 to 1927. Menz also manufactured a similar .25 ACP pistol introduced in 1925 as the Model 1, and took over production of the Beholla Pistol, marketing it as the Menta. in .25 ACP and .32 ACP.

The Liliput is one of the few pistols that can be owned in the United Kingdom without a license.

The Liliput is featured in a number of novels by Alistair MacLean, though he incorrectly refers to its calibre as ".21".

According to an Allied report, a Liliput pistol was issued to members of the Werwolf resistance force.

== See also ==
- List of cartridges by caliber
