= Amphimallon burmeisteri =

Scientific classification
- Kingdom: Animalia
- Phylum: Arthropoda
- Clade: Pancrustacea
- Class: Insecta
- Order: Coleoptera
- Suborder: Polyphaga
- Infraorder: Scarabaeiformia
- Family: Scarabaeidae
- Genus: Amphimallon
- Species: A. burmeisteri

Binomial name
- Amphimallon burmeisteri Brenske, 1886

Synonyms
- Rhizotrogus bonadonai Paulian, 1959; Rhizotrogus pilicollis Burmeister, 1855

Species of beetle

Amphimallon burmeisteri is a species of beetle in the Melolonthinae subfamily that can be found in Austria, Croatia, France, Hungary, Italy, Kosovo, Montenegro, Serbia, Slovenia and Voivodina.

== Conservation and habitat ==
In Germany, Amphimallon burmeisteri is classified as a rare species in the national Red List of scarab beetles. Its current population status is described as extremely rare, although both its long-term and short-term population trends are considered stable.

In Germany, the species has been recorded from dry grasslands on sandy soils in lowland areas. Confirmed modern records include southern Hesse, including the Viernheimer Heide near Lampertheim.

== Identification ==
Amphimallon burmeisteri can be difficult to distinguish from the closely related Amphimallon assimile. German Red List authorities note that differences in the species' daily flight periods may provide one of the most reliable means of distinguishing them.
