= Spermwhale Ridge =

Ridge in Antarctica

Location of Oscar II Coast on Antarctic Peninsula.

Spermwhale Ridge (65°47′S 62°48′W) is a sharp-crested ridge rising to about 800 m in northern Voden Heights and flanking the south side of Flask Glacier west of Bulkington Pass, on Oscar II Coast, Graham Land. Named by the United Kingdom Antarctic Place-Names Committee (UK-APC) in 1987. One of several names in this area from Melville's Moby Dick, reflecting a whaling theme.
