= Slav Point =

Ice-covered point in Antarctica

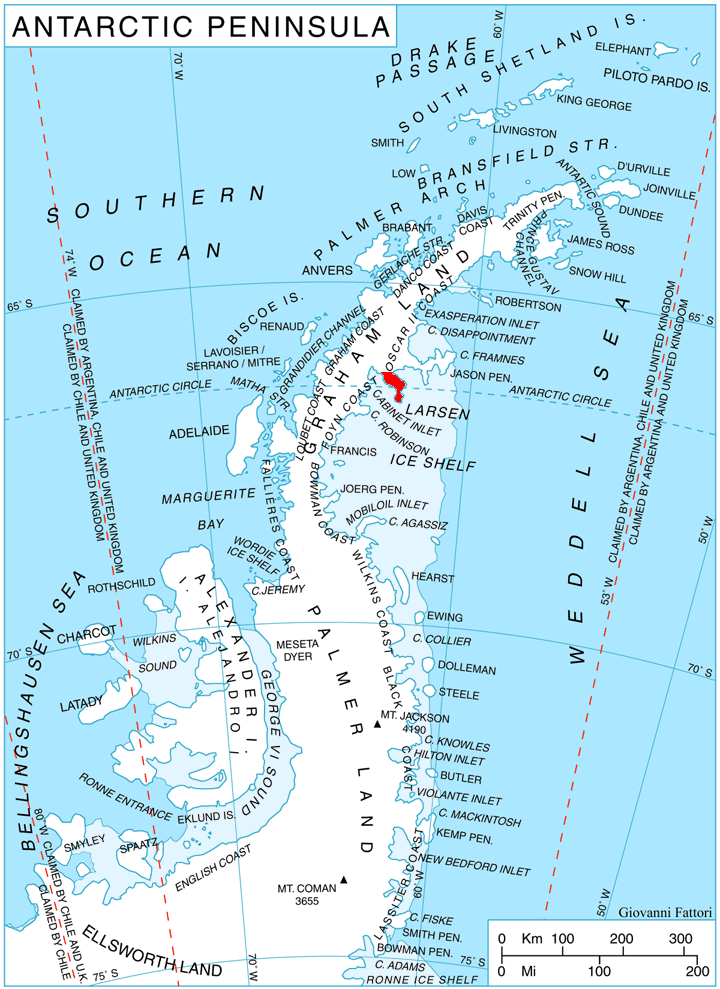
Location of Churchill Peninsula in Graham Land, Antarctic Peninsula.

Slav Point (Bulgarian: нос Слав, ‘Nos Slav’ \'nos 'slav\) is the ice-covered point on the north side of the entrance to Zimen Inlet on Oscar II Coast in Graham Land. It is situated on the east coast of Churchill Peninsula. The feature is named after the Bulgarian ruler Despot Alexius Slav (12th-13th century).

== Location ==
Slav Point is located at 66°28′50″S 62°31′00″W, which is 28.9 km north of Cape Alexander, 33.2 km south of Gulliver Nunatak, and 33.7 km west of Veier Head on Jason Peninsula. British mapping in 1974.

== Maps ==
- British Antarctic Territory: Graham Land. Scale 1:250000 topographic map. BAS 250 Series, Sheet SQ 19–20. London, 1974.
- Antarctic Digital Database (ADD). Scale 1:250000 topographic map of Antarctica. Scientific Committee on Antarctic Research (SCAR), 1993–2016.
