= Erika Pistol =

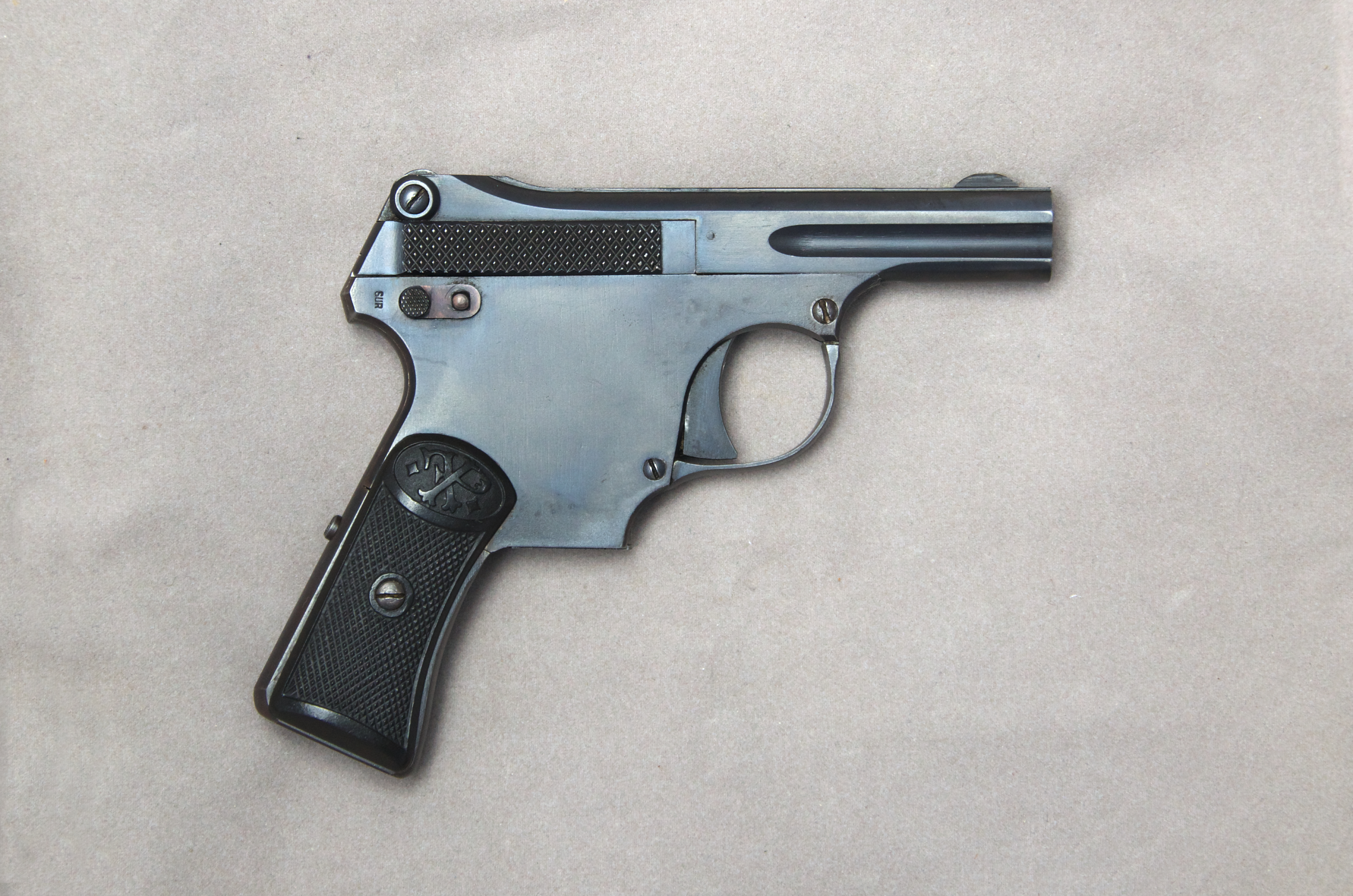
- Type: Semi-automatic pistol
- Place of origin: Austria-Hungary

Production history
- Designer: Franz Pfannl
- Manufacturer: Franz Pfannl
- Produced: 1912-1926
- No. built: about 3,500

Specifications
- Mass: 255 g (0.56 lb)
- Length: 100 mm (3.94 in); 135 mm (5.31 in)
- Barrel length: 42 mm (1.65 in); 56 mm (2.20 in)
- Cartridge: 4.25mm Liliput
- Caliber: 4.25 mm
- Action: Blowback
- Feed system: 6 rounds magazine
- Sights: fixed

The Erika is a semi-automatic pistol designed by the Austro-Hungarian gunsmith Franz Pfannl in the 1910s that uses the 4.25 mm Erika/Liliput cartridge.

== Design and development ==
This pistol was developed in Austria in 1912 by gunsmith Franz Pfannl; it is a semi-automatic pistol with a 6-round magazine. The pistol features a magazine well in front of the trigger guard, a lever safety, fixed sights, a single-action trigger, and a blued finish. The pistol was not very popular and was not widely distributed. Production ceased in 1926, and it is estimated that no more than 3,500 units were manufactured. There were two versions, a short one 100 mm long with a 42 mm barrel and a long (and less common) one 135 mm long with a 56 mm barrel.

The 4.25mm Erika cartridge was adopted by the Menz company for the Liliput pistol in 1920, and was used more in this weapon so the cartridge ended up being known as the 4.25mm Liliput.

Due to their limited production and the rarity of their design, specimens in excellent condition can be valued at up to $3,000 USD.
