= Lyttelton Ridge =

Ridge in Antarctica

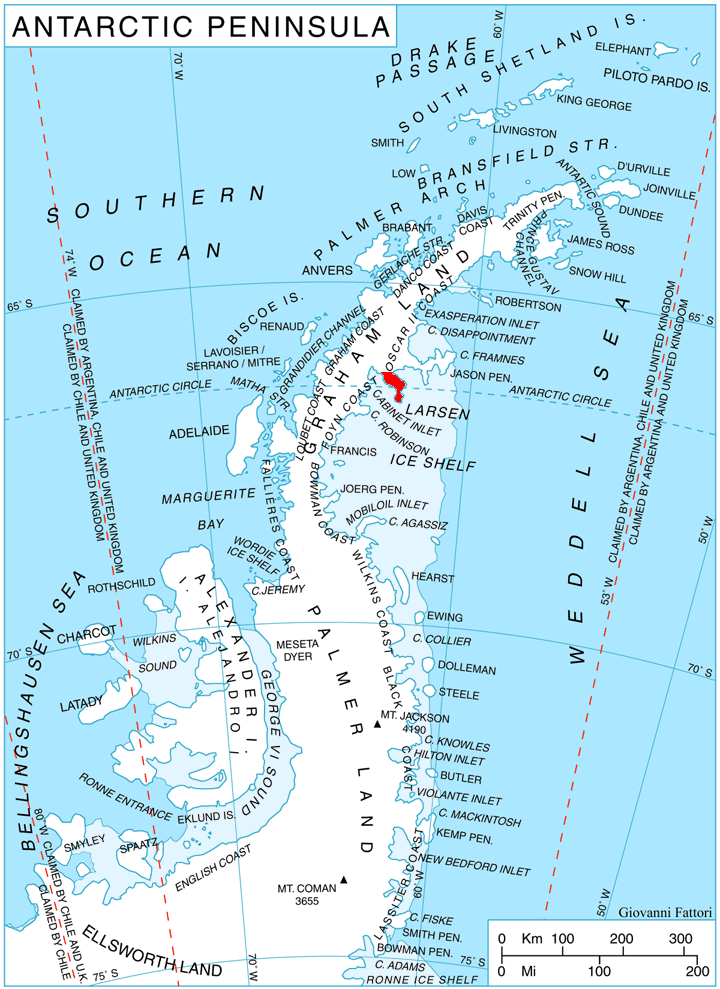
Location of Churchill Peninsula in Graham Land, Antarctic Peninsula.

Lyttelton Ridge (66°22′S 63°7′W) is a dark, jagged ridge, 425 metres (1,400 ft) high, extending 4 nautical miles (7 km) in a northwest–southeast direction along the west side of Churchill Peninsula, on the east coast of Graham Land, Antarctic Peninsula. It was charted in 1947 by the Falkland Islands Dependencies Survey, who named it for Rt. Hon. Oliver Lyttelton, M.P., then British Minister of Production and member of the War Cabinet. It was photographed from the air during 1947 by the Ronne Antarctic Research Expedition under Finn Ronne.
