= Bulkington (disambiguation) =

Bulkington is a village in Warwickshire, England.

Bulkington may also refer to:

- Bulkington (character), a character in Moby Dick
- Bulkington, Wiltshire, England
- Bulkington railway station, Warwickshire, England
- Bulkington Pass, Antarctica
