= Astro Cliffs =

Cliffs in Graham Land, Antarctic Peninsula

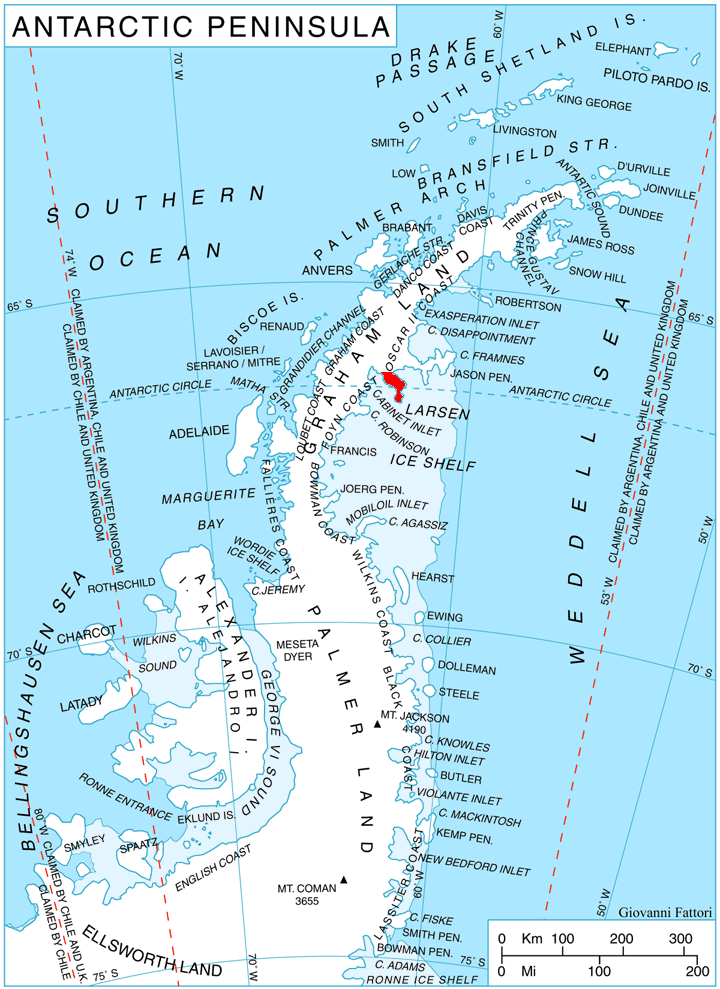
Location of Churchill Peninsula in Graham Land, Antarctic Peninsula.

The Astro Cliffs (66°40′S 62°26′W) are rock cliffs 60 metres (200 ft), situated at the southeast extremity of Churchill Peninsula, 6 miles (10 km) northeast of Cape Alexander on the east coast of Graham Land. Surveyed by the Falkland Islands Dependencies Survey in 1955, they mark the most southerly point of the survey. The UK Antarctic Place-Names Committee name arose from the astronomical fix obtained near the summit which was essential for the control of the survey traverse.
