= Mount Alibi =

Mountain in Graham Land, Antarctica

Mount Alibi (65°55′S 62°40′W) is a conspicuous mountain in eastern Voden Heights on Oscar II Coast in Graham Land, situated 3 nautical miles (6 km) east-southeast of Adit Nunatak on the north side of Leppard Glacier, in Graham Land. The mountain was discovered and photographed from the air by Sir Hubert Wilkins on December 20, 1928, and was named "Mount Napier Birks". The feature was not reidentified by the Falkland Islands Dependencies Survey (FIDS) in its 1947 survey of the area, and the United Kingdom Antarctic Place-Names Committee (UK-APC) subsequently gave the name Mount Birks to a mountain 40 nautical miles (70 km) northeastward. Following a FIDS survey in 1955, the mountain named by Wilkins was definitely identified as the feature now described. Because of past confusion as to its identity, the UK-APC has renamed it Mount Alibi; "Alibi" meaning "proof of presence elsewhere."
