= Amphimallon lusitanicum =

Scientific classification
- Kingdom: Animalia
- Phylum: Arthropoda
- Class: Insecta
- Order: Coleoptera
- Suborder: Polyphaga
- Infraorder: Scarabaeiformia
- Family: Scarabaeidae
- Genus: Amphimallon
- Species: A. lusitanicum

Binomial name
- Amphimallon lusitanicum (Gyllenhal, 1817)

Synonyms
- Monotropus angulicollis Fairmaire, 1859

Species of beetle

Amphimallon lusitanicum is a species of beetle in the Melolonthinae subfamily that can be found in Portugal and Spain.
