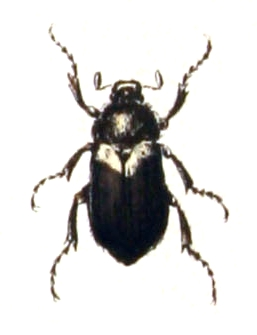

Scientific classification
- Kingdom: Animalia
- Phylum: Arthropoda
- Class: Insecta
- Order: Coleoptera
- Suborder: Polyphaga
- Infraorder: Scarabaeiformia
- Family: Scarabaeidae
- Genus: Amphimallon
- Species: A. atrum

Binomial name
- Amphimallon atrum (Herbst, 1790)

Synonyms
- Melolontha atrum Herbst, 1790; Melolontha fuscus Olivier, 1789; Rhizotrogus nomadicus Reiche, 1862

= Amphimallon atrum =

Species of beetle

Amphimallon atrum is a species of beetle in the Melolonthinae subfamily that can be found in Belgium, Italy, Spain and on the island of Corsica.
