= Amphimallon altaicum =

Scientific classification
- Kingdom: Animalia
- Phylum: Arthropoda
- Class: Insecta
- Order: Coleoptera
- Suborder: Polyphaga
- Infraorder: Scarabaeiformia
- Family: Scarabaeidae
- Genus: Amphimallon
- Species: A. altaicum

Binomial name
- Amphimallon altaicum Mannerheim, 1825

Synonyms
- Melolontha altaicum Mannerheim, 1825; Monotropus suwortzewi Semenov, 1891

Species of beetle

Amphimallon altaicum is a species of beetle in the Melolonthinae subfamily that can be found in Bulgaria, Greece, Romania and southern part of Russia.
