= Adit Nunatak =

Nunatak in Graham Land, Antarctica

Highest point
- Coordinates: 65°54′S 62°48′W

Geography
- Location: Oscar II Coast, Antarctica

Adit Nunatak is an exposed area of land not covered with ice or snow 3 miles (5 km) west-northwest of Mount Alibi on the north side of Leppard Glacier, in Voden Heights on Oscar II Coast in Graham Land. Surveyed by Falkland Islands Dependencies Survey (FIDS) in 1955. Named adit (entrance) by United Kingdom Antarctic Place-Names Committee (UK-APC), because at the time (1957), it marked the approach to an unsurveyed inland area between Leppard Glacier and Flask Glacier.
