= Marsh Spur =

Location of Oscar II Coast on Antarctic Peninsula.

Marsh Spur (65°53′S 62°38′W) is a spur in the eastern Voden Heights about 4.5 nautical miles (8 km) south of Bildad Peak and 4.5 nautical miles west of Scar Inlet on the east side of Graham Land, Antarctica. The spur is important geologically for the contact between basement complex gneisses and volcanics of probable Upper Jurassic age. The spur was named by the UK Antarctic Place-Names Committee for Anthony F. Marsh, a British Antarctic Survey geologist at Fossil Bluff and Hope Bay, 1963–65.
