= Amphimallon seidlitzi =

Scientific classification
- Kingdom: Animalia
- Phylum: Arthropoda
- Class: Insecta
- Order: Coleoptera
- Suborder: Polyphaga
- Infraorder: Scarabaeiformia
- Family: Scarabaeidae
- Genus: Amphimallon
- Species: A. seidlitzi

Binomial name
- Amphimallon seidlitzi Brenske, 1891

Synonyms
- Melolontha limbatipennis Villa & Villa, 1833; Melolontha trisinuatum Reitter, 1902

Species of beetle

Amphimallon seidlitzi is a species of beetle in the Melolonthinae subfamily that can be found in Portugal and Spain.
