= Bulkington Pass =

Mountain pass in Antarctica

Location of Oscar II Coast on Antarctic Peninsula.

Bulkington Pass (65°49′S 62°43′W) is a pass on the south side of Flask Glacier and west of Bildad Peak in Voden Heights on the east side of Graham Land. The pass trends northeast–southwest for 4 nautical miles (7 km) and provides a route from the ice piedmont north of Adit Nunatak to Flask Glacier. The toponym is one in a group applied by the UK Antarctic Place-Names Committee that reflects a whaling theme, Bulkington being a crewman on the vessel Pequod in Herman Melville's Moby Dick.
