= Peleg Peak =

Mountain in Antarctica

Location of Oscar II Coast on Antarctic Peninsula.

Peleg Peak (65°51′S 62°33′W) is a rock peak (920 m) in eastern Voden Heights on Oscar II Coast in Graham Land. It stands 4 nautical miles (7 km) northwest of Ishmael Peak. Surveyed by Falkland Islands Dependencies Survey (FIDS) in 1955. Named by United Kingdom Antarctic Place-Names Committee (UK-APC) after Captain Peleg, part-owner of the whaling ship Pequod in Herman Melville's Moby Dick.
