= Amphimallon jeannei =

Scientific classification
- Kingdom: Animalia
- Phylum: Arthropoda
- Class: Insecta
- Order: Coleoptera
- Suborder: Polyphaga
- Infraorder: Scarabaeiformia
- Family: Scarabaeidae
- Genus: Amphimallon
- Species: A. jeannei

Binomial name
- Amphimallon jeannei (Baraud, 1971)

Synonyms
- Monotropus jeannei Baraud, 1971

Species of beetle

Amphimallon jeannei is a species of beetle in the Melolonthinae subfamily that is endemic to Greece.
