= Amphimallon fuscum =

Scientific classification
- Kingdom: Animalia
- Phylum: Arthropoda
- Clade: Pancrustacea
- Class: Insecta
- Order: Coleoptera
- Suborder: Polyphaga
- Infraorder: Scarabaeiformia
- Family: Scarabaeidae
- Genus: Amphimallon
- Species: A. fuscum

Binomial name
- Amphimallon fuscum (Scopoli, 1786)

Synonyms
- Amphimallon logesi Mulsant, 1870; Amphimallon nebrodensis Ragusa, 1882; Amphimallon sirentensis Leoni, 1906

Species of beetle

Amphimallon fuscum is a species of beetle in the Melolonthinae subfamily that can be found in Italy, Kosovo, Montenegro, Serbia, Switzerland, Voivodina, and on the island of Sicily.
