= Amphimallon furvum =

Scientific classification
- Kingdom: Animalia
- Phylum: Arthropoda
- Class: Insecta
- Order: Coleoptera
- Suborder: Polyphaga
- Infraorder: Scarabaeiformia
- Family: Scarabaeidae
- Genus: Amphimallon
- Species: A. furvum

Binomial name
- Amphimallon furvum Germar, 1817

Species of beetle

Amphimallon furvum is a species of beetle in the Melolonthinae subfamily that can be found in Italy, Kosovo, Montenegro, Serbia, Switzerland and Voivodina.
