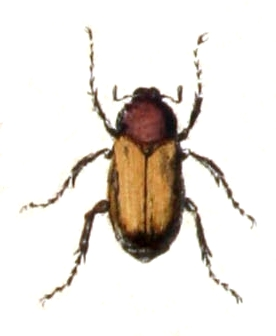

Scientific classification
- Kingdom: Animalia
- Phylum: Arthropoda
- Class: Insecta
- Order: Coleoptera
- Suborder: Polyphaga
- Infraorder: Scarabaeiformia
- Family: Scarabaeidae
- Genus: Amphimallon
- Species: A. ruficorne

Binomial name
- Amphimallon ruficorne (Fabricius 1775)

Synonyms
- Melolontha ruficorne Fabriciu, 1775; Melolontha marginatus Herbst, 1784; Melolontha paganus Olivier, 1789

= Amphimallon ruficorne =

Species of beetle

Amphimallon ruficorne is a species of beetle in the Melolonthinae subfamily that can be found in Bosnia and Herzegovina, Hungary, Romania, the Netherlands and Ukraine.
