= Amphimallon pygiale =

Scientific classification
- Kingdom: Animalia
- Phylum: Arthropoda
- Class: Insecta
- Order: Coleoptera
- Suborder: Polyphaga
- Infraorder: Scarabaeiformia
- Family: Scarabaeidae
- Genus: Amphimallon
- Species: A. pygiale

Binomial name
- Amphimallon pygiale Mulsant, 1846

Species of beetle

Amphimallon pygiale is a species of beetle in the Melolonthinae subfamily that can be found in France and Spain.
