= McCarroll Peak =

Rock peak on the east coast of Graham Land, Antarctica

Location of Oscar II Coast on Antarctic Peninsula.

McCarroll Peak (66°3′S 62°46′W) is a rock peak, 1,105 metres (3,625 ft) high, standing at the south side of Richthofen Pass on the east coast of Graham Land, Antarctica. The peak was probably first seen by the Swedish Antarctic Expedition under Otto Nordenskjöld, 1901–04. The name "Cape McCarroll" for H.G. McCarroll of Detroit, Michigan, was given to the south side of Nordenskjöld's "Richthofen Valley" (now Richthofen Pass) by Sir Hubert Wilkins on his flight of December 20, 1928. The name has been modified and applied to the peak here described in order to maintain the intended relationship between the McCarroll and Richthofen features.
