= Amphimallon javeti =

Scientific classification
- Kingdom: Animalia
- Phylum: Arthropoda
- Clade: Pancrustacea
- Class: Insecta
- Order: Coleoptera
- Suborder: Polyphaga
- Infraorder: Scarabaeiformia
- Family: Scarabaeidae
- Genus: Amphimallon
- Species: A. javeti

Binomial name
- Amphimallon javeti (Stierlin, 1864)

Synonyms
- Rhizotrogus javeti Stierlin, 1864

Species of beetle

Amphimallon javeti is a species of beetle in the Melolonthinae subfamily that is endemic to Sicily.
