= Amphimallon evorense =

Scientific classification
- Kingdom: Animalia
- Phylum: Arthropoda
- Class: Insecta
- Order: Coleoptera
- Suborder: Polyphaga
- Infraorder: Scarabaeiformia
- Family: Scarabaeidae
- Genus: Amphimallon
- Species: A. evorense

Binomial name
- Amphimallon evorense Reitter, 1913

Species of beetle

Amphimallon evorense is a species of beetle in the Melolonthinae subfamily that is endemic to Portugal.
