= Mount Lagado =

Mountain in Graham Land, Antarctica

Location of Oscar II Coast on Antarctic Peninsula.

Mount Lagado (66°0′S 63°15′W) is a mountain rising to about 1,200 metres (4,000 ft) on the south side of Leppard Glacier, west of Target Hill, on Oscar II Coast, Graham Land, Antarctica. In association with names from Jonathan Swift's Gulliver's Travels grouped in this area, it was named by the UK Antarctic Place-Names Committee in 1988 after Lagado, the capital of the flying island of Laputa.
