= Amphimallon cantabricum =

Scientific classification
- Kingdom: Animalia
- Phylum: Arthropoda
- Class: Insecta
- Order: Coleoptera
- Suborder: Polyphaga
- Infraorder: Scarabaeiformia
- Family: Scarabaeidae
- Genus: Amphimallon
- Species: A. cantabricum

Binomial name
- Amphimallon cantabricum Heyden, 1870

Synonyms
- Amphimallon felicitanus Reitter, 1902; Amphimallon trichroum Reitter, 1907

Species of beetle

Amphimallon cantabricum is a species of beetle in the Melolonthinae subfamily that can be found in Portugal and Spain.
