= Amphimallon pseudomajale =

Scientific classification
- Kingdom: Animalia
- Phylum: Arthropoda
- Class: Insecta
- Order: Coleoptera
- Suborder: Polyphaga
- Infraorder: Scarabaeiformia
- Family: Scarabaeidae
- Genus: Amphimallon
- Species: A. pseudomajale

Binomial name
- Amphimallon pseudomajale Sabatinelli, 1976

Species of beetle

Amphimallon pseudomajale is a species of beetle in the Melolonthinae subfamily that can be found in Italy and on the island of Sicily.
