= Amphimallon volgense =

Scientific classification
- Kingdom: Animalia
- Phylum: Arthropoda
- Class: Insecta
- Order: Coleoptera
- Suborder: Polyphaga
- Infraorder: Scarabaeiformia
- Family: Scarabaeidae
- Genus: Amphimallon
- Species: A. volgense

Binomial name
- Amphimallon volgense (Fischer, 1823)

Synonyms
- Melolontha volgense Fischer, 1823; Melolontha caspicus Ménétriés, 1832

Species of beetle

Amphimallon volgense is a species of beetle in the Melolonthinae subfamily that can be found in southern part of Russia and the Near East.
