= Amphimallon verticale =

Scientific classification
- Kingdom: Animalia
- Phylum: Arthropoda
- Class: Insecta
- Order: Coleoptera
- Suborder: Polyphaga
- Infraorder: Scarabaeiformia
- Family: Scarabaeidae
- Genus: Amphimallon
- Species: A. verticale

Binomial name
- Amphimallon verticale (Burmeister, 1855)

Synonyms
- Rhizotrogus verticale Burmeister, 1855

Species of beetle

Amphimallon verticale is a species of beetle in the Melolonthinae subfamily that can be found in Croatia and Greece.
