= Amphimallon roris =

Scientific classification
- Kingdom: Animalia
- Phylum: Arthropoda
- Class: Insecta
- Order: Coleoptera
- Suborder: Polyphaga
- Infraorder: Scarabaeiformia
- Family: Scarabaeidae
- Genus: Amphimallon
- Species: A. roris

Binomial name
- Amphimallon roris Baraud, 1981

Species of beetle

Amphimallon roris is a species of beetle in the Melolonthinae subfamily that can be found in Portugal and Spain.
