= Amphimallon nigrum =

Scientific classification
- Kingdom: Animalia
- Phylum: Arthropoda
- Class: Insecta
- Order: Coleoptera
- Suborder: Polyphaga
- Infraorder: Scarabaeiformia
- Family: Scarabaeidae
- Genus: Amphimallon
- Species: A. nigrum

Binomial name
- Amphimallon nigrum Waltl, 1835

Synonyms
- Rhizotrogus flavicornis Blanchard, 1850

Species of beetle

Amphimallon nigrum is a species of beetle in the Melolonthinae subfamily that is endemic to Spain.
