= Amphimallon pini =

Scientific classification
- Kingdom: Animalia
- Phylum: Arthropoda
- Clade: Pancrustacea
- Class: Insecta
- Order: Coleoptera
- Suborder: Polyphaga
- Infraorder: Scarabaeiformia
- Family: Scarabaeidae
- Genus: Amphimallon
- Species: A. pini

Binomial name
- Amphimallon pini (Olivier, 1789)

Synonyms
- Amphimallon bicolor Mulsant, 1842; Amphimallon diluticollis Baraud & Tauzin, 1987; Amphimallon ustulatipenne Mulsant, 1842

Species of beetle

Amphimallon pini is a species of beetle in the Melolonthinae subfamily that can be found in France Italy, and Spain.
