= Mount Zadruga =

Mountain in Graham Land, Antarctica

Location of Oscar II Coast on Antarctic Peninsula.

Mount Zadruga (Bulgarian: връх Задруга, romanized: vrah Zadruga, IPA: [ˈvrɤɣ zɐˈdruɡɐ]) is the ice-covered peak rising to 1700 m in the west part of Voden Heights on Oscar II Coast in Graham Land. It surmounts upper Flask Glacier to the north, and a tributary to Fleece Glacier to the south-southeast. The feature is named after the settlement of Zadruga in Northeastern Bulgaria.

== Location ==
Mount Zadruga is located at 65°48′29″S 63°12′55″W, which is 11.45 km south-southwest of Peychinov Crag, 27.7 km west of Bildad Peak, 12.9 km north of Moider Peak, and 33 km east-southeast of Mount Chevreux on Graham Coast.

== Maps ==
- British Antarctic Territory. Scale 1:200000 topographic map. DOS 610 Series, Sheet W 65 62. Directorate of Overseas Surveys, Tolworth, UK, 1976.
- Antarctic Digital Database (ADD). Scale 1:250000 topographic map of Antarctica. Scientific Committee on Antarctic Research (SCAR). Since 1993, regularly upgraded and updated.
