= Lilliput Nunataks =

The Lilliput Nunataks (66°8′S 62°40′W) are three nunataks, from 600 to 700 metres (2,000 to 2,300 ft) high and trending southeast–northwest, located 3 nautical miles (6 km) north of Gulliver Nunatak on the east side of Graham Land, Antarctica. The nunataks are snow free on their southeast sides. They were charted by the Falkland Islands Dependencies Survey and photographed from the air by the Ronne Antarctic Research Expedition in 1947. The name, from Jonathan Swift's Gulliver's Travels, means land of small people and was applied by the UK Antarctic Place-Names Committee in association with Gulliver Nunatak.
