= Amphimallon krali =

Scientific classification
- Kingdom: Animalia
- Phylum: Arthropoda
- Clade: Pancrustacea
- Class: Insecta
- Order: Coleoptera
- Suborder: Polyphaga
- Infraorder: Scarabaeiformia
- Family: Scarabaeidae
- Genus: Amphimallon
- Species: A. krali

Binomial name
- Amphimallon krali Montreuil, 2002

Species of beetle

Amphimallon krali is a species of beetle in the Melolonthinae subfamily that is endemic to Dodecanese islands.
