= Lilliput Kidswear =

Indian clothing company

- Company logo
- Industry: Clothing
- Headquarters: New Delhi, India

Lilliput Kidswear is an Indian clothing brand that makes clothes specifically for children and is headquartered in New Delhi, India.

== History ==
Sanjeev Narula founded Lilliput Kidswear in 2003. Bain Capital Partners invested $60 million into Lilliput Kidswear in May 2010. Two weeks after the IPO of Lilliput, a whistle blower called to inform investment firms that the revenue figures in Lilliput were inflated. Bain Capital Partners sued the audit firm Ernst & Young Global Limited, after the invested in Lilliput kidswear on the advice of the auditing firm. Bain Capital claimed to have incurred a loss of $60 million over the investment. Bain Capital left the company in 2013 according to the CEO of Lilliput Kidswear.

== Controversy over fraud ==
In 2013, Lilliput Kidswear bought clothing worth $5,000,000 (40 Crores BDT) from 22 Bangladeshi garment suppliers. After receiving no payment, Central bank of Bangladesh via Bangladesh government approached the Indian government to solve the issue. After mediation from Indian Commerce ministerministry, Lilliput Kidswear made no payments to Bangladeshi suppliers. As a result, those supplier companies got bankrupted and incurred a great loss resulting shutdown of their factories.
