= Swift Peak =

Mountain in Antarctica

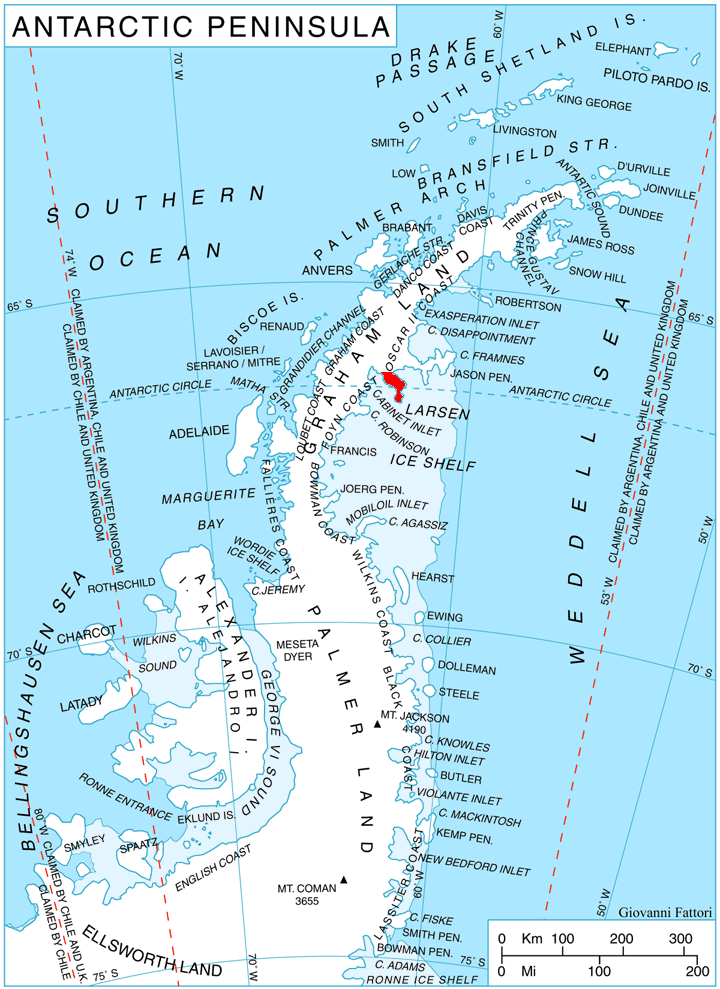
Location of Churchill Peninsula in Graham Land, Antarctic Peninsula.

Swift Peak (66°19′S 63°8′W) is a peak that is the highest point of an undulating, mainly snow-covered range of hills rising to about 1,000 m. Located at the north end of Churchill Peninsula on the east coast of Graham Land. Charted by the Falkland Islands Dependencies Survey (FIDS) and photographed from the air by the Ronne Antarctic Research Expedition (RARE) in 1947. Named by United Kingdom Antarctic Place-Names Committee (UK-APC) after Jonathan Swift (1667–1745), English author of Gulliver's Travels, a novel from which several nearby features are named.
