= Mount Fritsche =

Mountain in Graham Land, Antarctica

Location of Oscar II Coast on Antarctic Peninsula.

Mount Fritsche (66°0′S 62°42′W) is a snow-capped coastal mountain with many steep rock faces, located on the north side of Richthofen Pass in eastern Graham Land, Antarctica. This mountain was probably first seen by Otto Nordenskiöld of the Swedish Antarctic Expedition, 1901–04. Sir Hubert Wilkins observed the feature from the air on December 20, 1928, and named it "Cape Fritsche" after Carl B. Fritsche of Detroit, MI. The generic term has been amended in keeping with the nature of the feature.
