= Lilliput Lane =

British range of model cottages and scenes

- Founded: 1982
- Defunct: 2016
- Headquarters: Langholm, Scotland, UK
- Area served: Worldwide
- Products: Small Scale Models
- Parent: Enesco

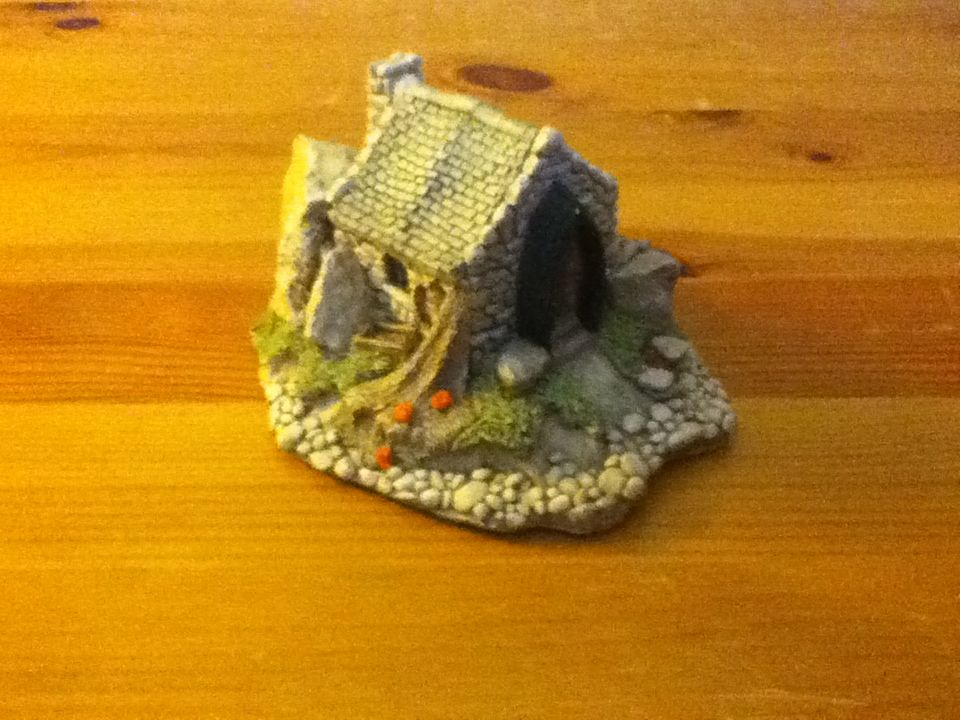
"Fisherman's Bothy"

Lilliput Lane, founded in 1982 by David Tate, was a company known for its extensive range of realistic miniature handmade models of real English and Welsh cottages and scenes. Formerly based in Workington, and Penrith, Cumbria, the company moved to Langholm in 2009. It has produced models ranging from The Tower of London and Tower Bridge to small fisherman's bothies as seen in the adjacent image. The models sell in over 50 countries around the world. In 2016, Enesco announced they were closing their production factory in Langholm, and also announced that Lilliput Lane would cease to be manufactured. In January 2017, David Tate died after a nine-year battle with cancer.
