= 2mm Kolibri =

Centerfire pistol cartridge

2.7mm Kolibri
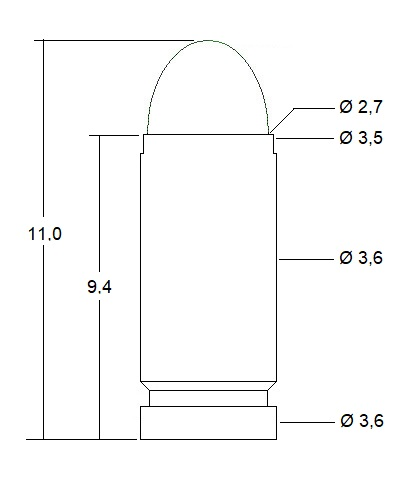
- 2mm Kolibri cartridge dimensions
- Type: Centerfire ammunition
- Place of origin: Austria-Hungary

Production history
- Designer: Franz Pfannl
- Designed: 1914
- Manufacturer: Kolibri
- Produced: 1914
- No. built: ~1000 (pistol)

Specifications
- Case type: Rimless, straight
- Bullet diameter: 2.7 mm (0.11 in)
- Neck diameter: 3.5 mm (0.14 in)
- Base diameter: 3.6 mm (0.14 in)
- Rim diameter: 3.6 mm (0.14 in)
- Case length: 9.4 mm (0.37 in)
- Overall length: 11 mm (0.43 in)

Ballistic performance
Bullet mass/type	Velocity	Energy
0.2 g (3 gr) FMJ	200 m/s (660 ft/s)	4 J (3.0 ft⋅lbf)
- Source: Cartridges of the World

The 2mm Kolibri (also known as the 2.7mm Kolibri Car Pistol or 2.7×9mm Kolibri) was the smallest commercially available centerfire cartridge, patented in 1910 and introduced in 1914 by Franz Pfannl, an Austrian watchmaker, with financial support from Georg Grabner. It was designed to accompany the Kolibri semi-auto pistol or single-shot pistol, both marketed as self-defense weapons, but somewhat underpowered.

The name is derived from Kolibri, the German word for hummingbird, which is among the smallest of birds.

== Background ==
The cartridge weighs 5.3 grams (82 grains), measures 3.6 millimetres (0.14 in) at its widest point, and 11 millimetres (0.43 in) from the base of the primer to the tip of the bullet. The cartridge is headspaced on the mouth of the case. The bullet itself masses 0.2 grams (3 grains), and is estimated to have a normal muzzle velocity of 200 metres per second (660 ft/s), resulting in a muzzle energy of 4 joules (3 ft-lbs). For perspective, an average person's punch measures 10-15 joules (7-11 ft-lbs), meaning that the round has less energy than a punch.

The round was not well accepted. The 2mm Kolibri's small size makes handling and loading individual cartridges difficult, and the bullet itself is fairly weak, with literature at the time suggesting the round was capable of penetrating only 10–40 mm (0.39–1.57 in) of pine board. The round also suffers some accuracy issues, since the technology of the time was incapable of applying rifling to the bore of such a small caliber, resulting in no spin on the bullet.

Due to the weakness and inaccuracy of the firearm, the 2mm Kolibri was advertised as a ladies' self-defence weapon that was small enough to fit inside a handbag. While probably not effective against a mugger if shot at the chest or limbs, it could potentially inflict some damage if shot at the attacker's face. It was discontinued in 1914 with the outbreak of World War I.

The 2mm gun was replaced by 3mm and 4mm weapons in the series, which was discontinued in 1938.

As with the related firearm series, this gun is now a collector's item with about a thousand ever produced. It is notable for firing the smallest centerfire cartridge ever produced.

== See also ==
- List of handgun cartridges
- 2 mm caliber
- Table of handgun and rifle cartridges
