= Richthofen Pass =

Pass on the east coast of Graham Land

Location of Oscar II Coast on Antarctic Peninsula.

Richthofen Pass (66°1′S 62°42′W) is a pass, 1 nautical mile (1.9 km) wide, between Mount Fritsche and the rock wall north of McCarroll Peak, on the east coast of Graham Land. Discovered and photographed in 1902 by the Swedish Antarctic Expedition under Nordenskjold, who named it Richthofen Valley for Baron Ferdinand von Richthofen, German geographer and geologist. The feature was found to be a pass by the Falkland Islands Dependencies Survey (FIDS) in 1955.
