= Amphimallon ochraceum =

Scientific classification
- Kingdom: Animalia
- Phylum: Arthropoda
- Class: Insecta
- Order: Coleoptera
- Suborder: Polyphaga
- Infraorder: Scarabaeiformia
- Family: Scarabaeidae
- Genus: Amphimallon
- Species: A. ochraceum

Binomial name
- Amphimallon ochraceum (Knoch, 1801)

Synonyms
- Rhizotrogus maldinesi Reitter, 1902

Species of beetle

Amphimallon ochraceum is a species of beetle in the Melolonthinae subfamily that can be found in Austria, Italy, Spain and the Britain I.
