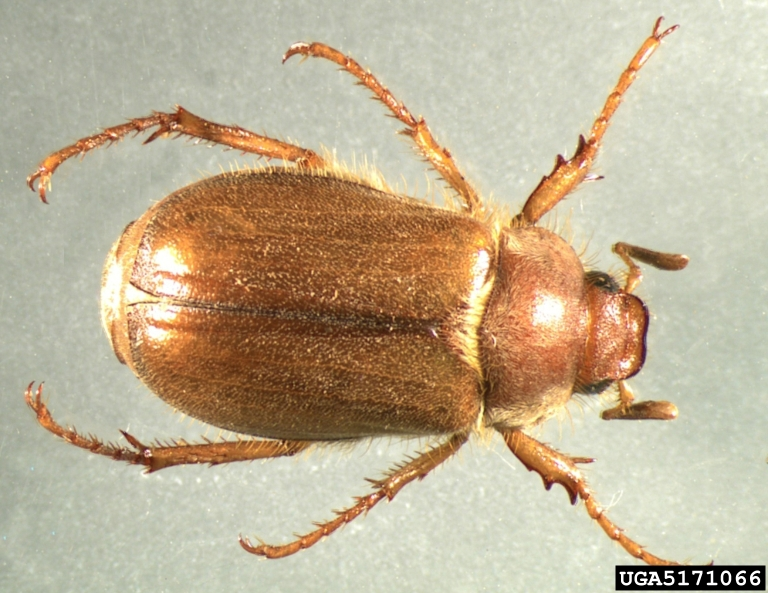

Scientific classification
- Kingdom: Animalia
- Phylum: Arthropoda
- Clade: Pancrustacea
- Class: Insecta
- Order: Coleoptera
- Suborder: Polyphaga
- Infraorder: Scarabaeiformia
- Family: Scarabaeidae
- Genus: Amphimallon
- Species: A. majale

Binomial name
- Amphimallon majale (Razoumowsky, 1789)

Synonyms
- Melolontha majalis Razoumowsky, 1789; Rhizotrogus majalis (Razoumowsky, 1789)

= European chafer =

Species of beetle

The European chafer (Amphimallon majale; formerly classified as Rhizotrogus majalis) is a beetle of the family Scarabaeidae. Formerly found only in continental Europe, this invasive species is now found at temperate latitudes in North America. The large, white grubs of A. majale feed on the roots of most cool-latitude grasses, both wild and cultivated. This has made the European chafer an enemy of lawns.

== Description ==
=== Imago ===
Adult beetles are medium-sized, light reddish-brown, and approximately 13–14 millimetres (1/2–9/16 in) long. Their pronotum features a narrow band of light-yellow setae and the underside of the thorax has similar coloured setae. The tip of the abdomen protrudes beyond the wing covers. Wing covers have longitudinal grooves.

=== Larvae ===
Larvae are white-coloured and C-shaped, with a yellow-brown head and six jointed legs. The raster has two distinct rows of small spines that diverge outward at the tip of the abdomen. Fully grown larvae are 20–23 millimetres (25/32–29/32 in) long.

=== Pupae and eggs ===
The pupae of the European chafer resemble those of the other turf-infesting scarab beetles, such as the Japanese beetle. Pupae are about 16 millimetres (5/8 in) long. Eggs are shiny and oval, milky-white when freshly laid, but later turning dull gray, approximately 2.3 by 2.7 millimetres (3/32 in × 7/64 in).

== Life cycle ==
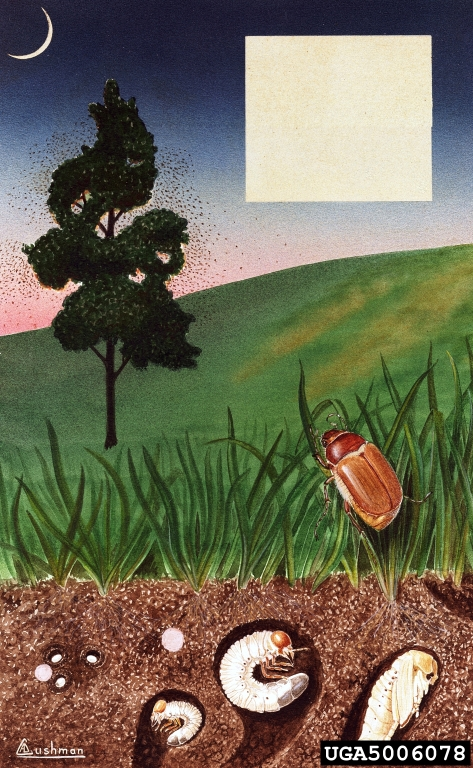
Life cycle of A. majale

The European chafer has a 1-year life cycle. The imago, or adult beetle, stage is quite short, lasting 1–2 weeks. The adults come out of the ground in late spring and mate in large swarms, usually on low trees and shrubs. The beetles are most active on warm, clear nights when the temperature is above 19 °C (66 °F). They emerge at about 8:30 pm, mate through the night, and return to the soil by daybreak. Beetles may return to the trees to re-mate several times over the mating period. Late in the period, the adult carcasses may litter the ground beneath trees used for swarming.

Female chafers lay 20-40 eggs over their lifespan. They are laid singly, 5–10 centimetres (2–4 in) deep in moist soil, and take 2 weeks to hatch. The grubs hatch by late July. The grub population consists mainly of first instars in early- to mid-August, second instars by early September, and third instars by mid-September to early October. In frost zones, the grubs feed until November, then move deeper into the soil. In frost-free areas, the larva will feed all winter. Vigorous feeding occurs from March through May. In early June, the grubs again move deeper, from 5–25 centimetres (2–10 in), to form earthen cells and pupate. The pre-pupal and pupal stages last 2–4 days and 2 weeks, respectively. By June, the new beetles begin emerging.

== Lawn destruction ==
The damage caused by chafer infestation to residential lawns is exacerbated by the fact that its grubs are an attractive food source for local fauna such as crows, skunks and raccoons, who relentlessly dig up the turf in search of the morsels. Homeowners often find themselves bewildered by the speed and extent of the destruction which may ensue.
