= Ishmael Peak =

Mountain in Antarctica

Location of Oscar II Coast on Antarctic Peninsula.

Ishmael Peak (65°53′S 62°25′W) is a conspicuous detached rock peak in eastern Voden Heights, 4 miles (6.4 km) south of Spouter Peak, which marks the north side of the mouth of Leppard Glacier, on the east coast of Graham Land, Antarctica. It was surveyed by the Falkland Islands Dependencies Survey in 1947 and 1955, and was named by the UK Antarctic Place-Names Committee after Ishmael, the narrator of Herman Melville's story Moby-Dick.
