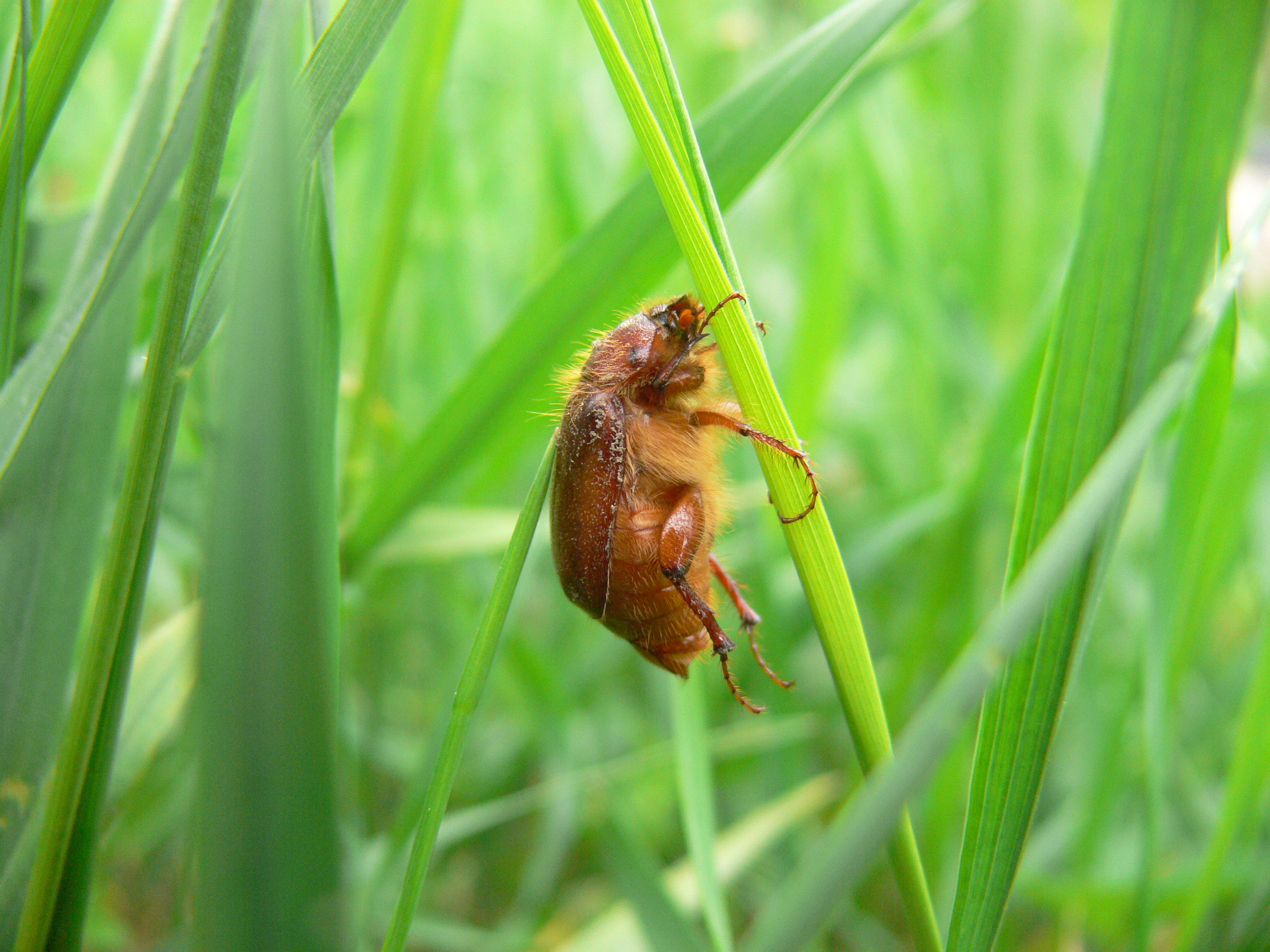

Scientific classification
- Kingdom: Animalia
- Phylum: Arthropoda
- Class: Insecta
- Order: Coleoptera
- Suborder: Polyphaga
- Infraorder: Scarabaeiformia
- Family: Scarabaeidae
- Genus: Amphimallon
- Species: A. assimile

Binomial name
- Amphimallon assimile (Herbst, 1790)

Synonyms
- Melolontha assimile Herbst, 1790; Melolontha aprilinus Duftschmidt, 1805; Amphimallon fulvicolle Erichson, 1847; Rhizotrogus neapolitanus Brenske, 1902; Amphimallon obscurum Brenske, 1890

= Amphimallon assimile =

Species of beetle

Amphimallon assimile is a species of beetle in the Melolonthinae subfamily that can be found in France and Italy.
