= 4.25mm Liliput =

Austrian pistol cartridge

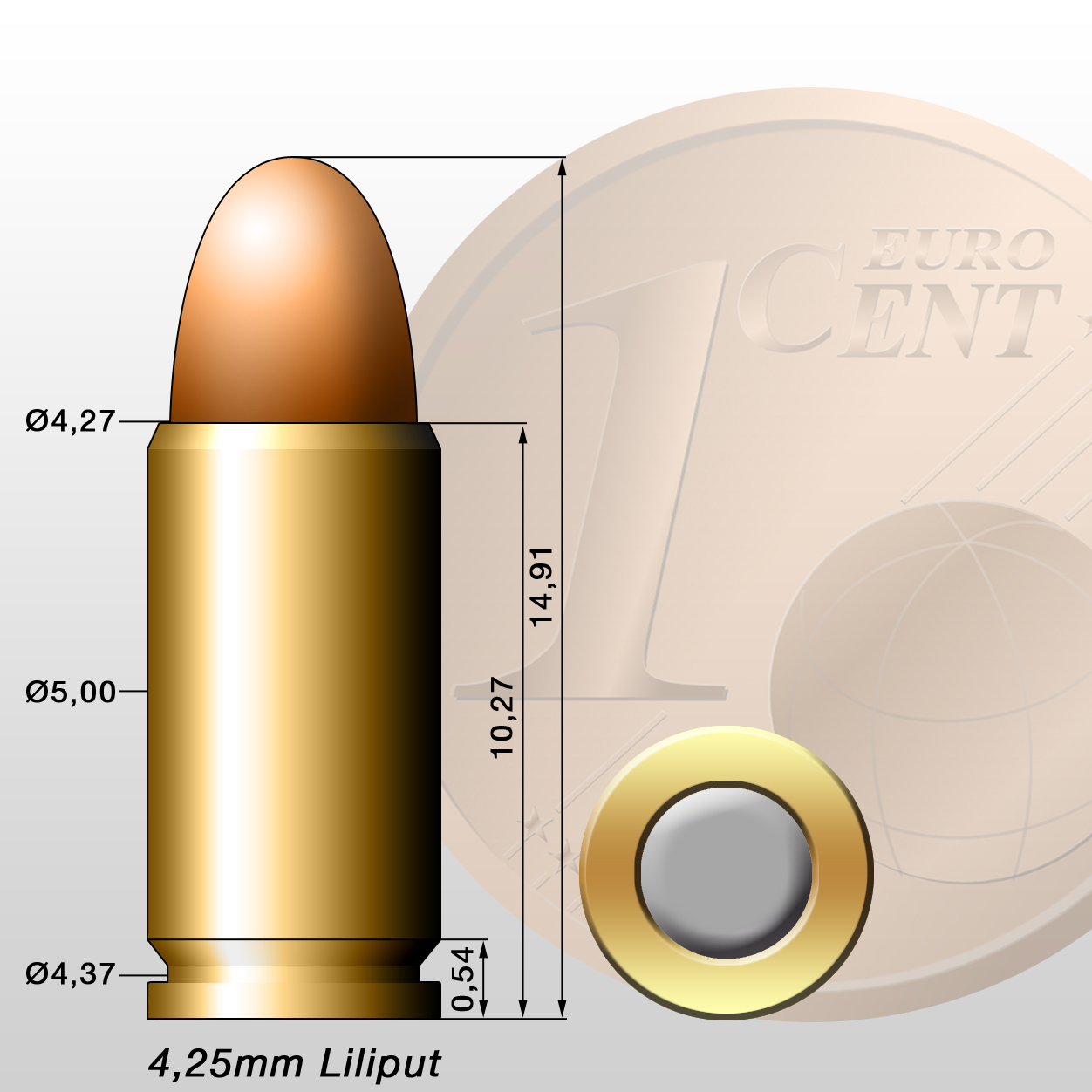
- Type: Pistol
- Place of origin: Austria-Hungary

Specifications
- Case type: Rimless, straight
- Bullet diameter: 4.27 mm (0.168 in)
- Neck diameter: 5.00 mm (0.197 in)
- Base diameter: 5.00 mm (0.197 in)
- Rim diameter: 5.00 mm (0.197 in)
- Case length: 10.27 mm (0.404 in)
- Overall length: 14.91 mm (0.587 in)

Ballistic performance
Bullet mass/type	Velocity	Energy
12 gr (1 g) FMJ	810 ft/s (250 m/s)	17 ft⋅lbf (23 J)
- Source(s): "Textbook of Automatic Pistols"

The 4.25mm Liliput is a centerfire rimless straight-sided cartridge originally produced in Austria for self-loading pocket pistols made by Erika before World War I. In 1920 the Liliput pistol was manufactured by August Menz of Suhl to use the cartridge. The cartridge became best known by the Liliput name used on German ammunition after Austria ceased production. The cartridge headspaces on the mouth of the case. It was the smallest centerfire cartridge in production in the 1930s.

== See also ==
- List of cartridges by caliber
