= Moider Peak =

Mountain in Graham Land, Antarctica

Moider Peak (65°55′S 63°9′W) is a peak, 1,165 metres (3,820 ft) high, on the divide between Fleece Glacier and the upper reaches of Leppard Glacier, 12 nautical miles (22 km) west of Mount Alibi, on the east side of Graham Land, Antarctica. It was surveyed by the Falkland Islands Dependencies Survey in 1955, and was named by the UK Antarctic Place-Names Committee; "moider" can mean to perplex or to confuse, and at the time of the survey, the area to the northwest of this peak was obscured by low cloud, and its relationship with other features in the vicinity could not be determined.
