= Gulliver Nunatak =

Summit in Graham Land, Antarctica

Location of Oscar II Coast on Antarctic Peninsula.

Gulliver Nunatak (66°12′S 62°40′W) is a nunatak with a flat, ice-free summit, 575 metres (1,890 ft) high, at the north side of Adie Inlet, on the east coast of Graham Land, Antarctica. It was charted by the Falkland Islands Dependencies Survey (FIDS) and photographed from the air by the Ronne Antarctic Research Expedition (RARE) in 1947. It was named by the FIDS for the fictional character in Jonathan Swift's Gulliver's Travels, because when viewed from the southeast its appearance is suggestive of a man lying on his back with his head toward the south.
