= Paolo Luigioni =

Italian entomologist (1873–1937)

Paolo Luigioni (9 February 1873, Rome – 6 May 1937, Rome) was an Italian entomologist. Luigioni was a Rome University professor and Curator of the Museo Civico di Zoologia di Roma where the main his collection is kept. Other parts are in the Natural History Museum in Pescasseroli.

He specialised in the Coleoptera, Hemiptera, and other insects of the Abruzzi, now a National Park (Abruzzo, Lazio and Molise National Park.)
