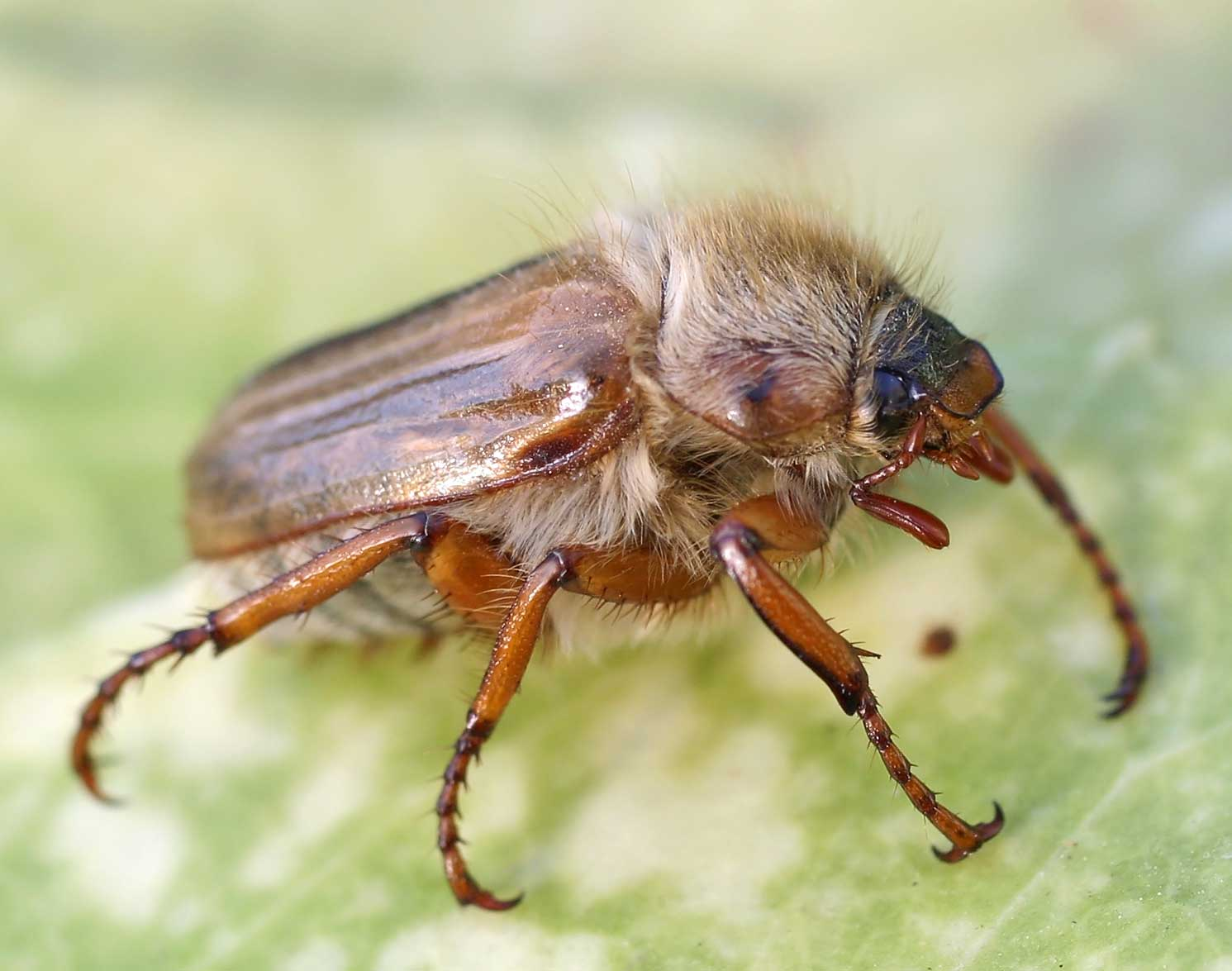
- Amphimallon solstitiale

Scientific classification
- Kingdom: Animalia
- Phylum: Arthropoda
- Clade: Pancrustacea
- Class: Insecta
- Order: Coleoptera
- Suborder: Polyphaga
- Infraorder: Scarabaeiformia
- Family: Scarabaeidae
- Subfamily: Melolonthinae
- Tribe: Rhizotrogini
- Genus: Amphimallon; Latreille, 1825

Synonyms
- Amphimallon (Erytrotrogus) Iablokoff Khnzorian, 1955; Amphimallina Reitter, 1905; Amphimallus Mulsant, 1842; Microdonta Hope, 1837; Zantheumia Stephens, 1829

= Amphimallon =

Genus of beetles

Amphimallon is a genus of beetles of the family Scarabaeidae.

== Species ==
- Amphimallon adanense Montreuil, 2000
- Amphimallon alatavicum Medvedev, 1951
- Amphimallon alexandri Uliana & Montreuil, 2022
- Amphimallon altaicum (Mannerheim, 1825)
- Amphimallon arianae Fairmaire, 1879
- Amphimallon arnaudi Montreuil & Uliana, 2022
- Amphimallon arnoldii (Medvedev, 1951)
- Amphimallon assimile (Herbst, 1790)
- Amphimallon atrum (Herbst, 1790)
- Amphimallon besnardi Keith, 2009
- Amphimallon brucki (Fairmaire, 1879)
- Amphimallon burmeisteri (Brenske, 1886)
- Amphimallon cantabricum (Heyden, 1870)
- Amphimallon circassicum (Brenske, 1894)
- Amphimallon circumligatum (Peyerimhoff, 1945)
- Amphimallon claudiae Lo Cascio, Davranoglou & Manolas, 2025
- Amphimallon crinitus (Brenske, 1894)
- Amphimallon dalmatinum (Brenske, 1894)
- Amphimallon evorense Reitter, 1913
- Amphimallon fallenii (Gyllenhal, 1817)
- Amphimallon fissiceps (Fairmaire, 1860)
- Amphimallon furvum (Germar, 1817)
- Amphimallon fuscum (Scopoli, 1786)
- Amphimallon galleti (Baraud, 1970)
- Amphimallon gianfranceschii (Luigioni, 1931)
- Amphimallon helenae (Iablokoff-Khnzorian, 1983)
- Amphimallon ilustre López Colón & Bahillo de la Puebla, 2022
- Amphimallon insculptus (Brenske, 1889)
- Amphimallon javeti (Stierlin, 1864)
- Amphimallon jeannae Montreuil, 2000
- Amphimallon jeannei (Baraud, 1971)
- Amphimallon jedlickai Balthasar, 1936
- Amphimallon kalliesi Montreuil, 2013
- Amphimallon keithi Montreuil, 2002
- Amphimallon krali Montreuil, 2002
- Amphimallon leuthneri (Reitter, 1902)
- Amphimallon litigiosus (Fairmaire, 1860)
- Amphimallon lusitanicum (Gyllenhal, 1817)
- Amphimallon maevae Montreuil, 1999
- Amphimallon majale (Razoumowsky, 1789) – European chafer
- Amphimallon maniense Montreuil, 2000
- Amphimallon menori Báguena, 1955
- Amphimallon montanum Zur Strassen, 1954
- Amphimallon mussardi (Antoine, 1960)
- Amphimallon naceyroi (Mulsant, 1859)
- Amphimallon nigripenne (Reitter, 1902)
- Amphimallon nigrum (Waltl, 1835)
- Amphimallon obscurus (Reiche, 1864)
- Amphimallon occidentalis (Petrovitz, 1964)
- Amphimallon ochraceum (Knoch, 1801)
- Amphimallon pardoi (Baraud, 1971)
- Amphimallon peropacus (Reitter, 1911)
- Amphimallon pim Lo Cascio, Davranoglou & Manolas, 2025
- Amphimallon pini (Olivier, 1789)
- Amphimallon pseudomajale Sabatinelli, 1976
- Amphimallon pygiale (Mulsant, 1846)
- Amphimallon roris Baraud, 1981
- Amphimallon ruficorne (Fabricius, 1775)
- Amphimallon safiense Montreuil, 2000
- Amphimallon sainzi (Graëlls, 1858)
- Amphimallon seidlitzi (Brenske, 1891)
- Amphimallon semenovi Medvedev, 1951
- Amphimallon sogdianum Nikolajev, 2001
- Amphimallon solstitiale (Linnaeus, 1758) – summer chafer, European June beetle
- Amphimallon spartanum (Brenske, 1884)
- Amphimallon suturalis (Lucas, 1859)
- Amphimallon theryi (Peyerimhoff, 1945)
- Amphimallon variolatus (Fairmaire, 1880)
- Amphimallon vernale (Brullé, 1832)
- Amphimallon verticale (Burmeister, 1855)
- Amphimallon vitalei (Luigioni, 1932)
- Amphimallon vivesi (Baraud, 1967)
- Amphimallon volgense (Fischer von Waldheim, 1823)
- Amphimallon vulpecula (Peyerimhoff, 1931)
- Amphimallon zorni Montreuil, 2013
