= Franz Pfannl =

Austrian watchmaker

Franz Pfannl was an Austrian watchmaker and inventor, best known for creating the 2.7mm Kolibri pistol, the smallest commercially available centerfire pistol and cartridge ever produced. The Kolibri pistol was designed in 1910 and manufactured between 1914 and 1938. Pfannl's work on this pistol was financially supported by Georg Grabner.

In addition to the Kolibri pistol, Pfannl also designed other miniature firearms, such as the 2mm Berloque pinfire rifle. His firearms were known for their precision engineering and tiny dimensions, which required meticulous craftsmanship.

The 2.7mm Kolibri pistol was primarily marketed for self-defense. Despite its low penetration power, the pistol's small size and high velocity still made it potentially dangerous. It was equipped with a six-round magazine and operated semiautomatically, firing one shot per pull of the trigger until the magazine was emptied. The recoil of the Kolibri pistol was virtually nonexistent due to the minuscule size of the projectile, making it an interesting piece both for collectors and firearm enthusiasts.
