= Cape Alexander =

Cape in Antarctica

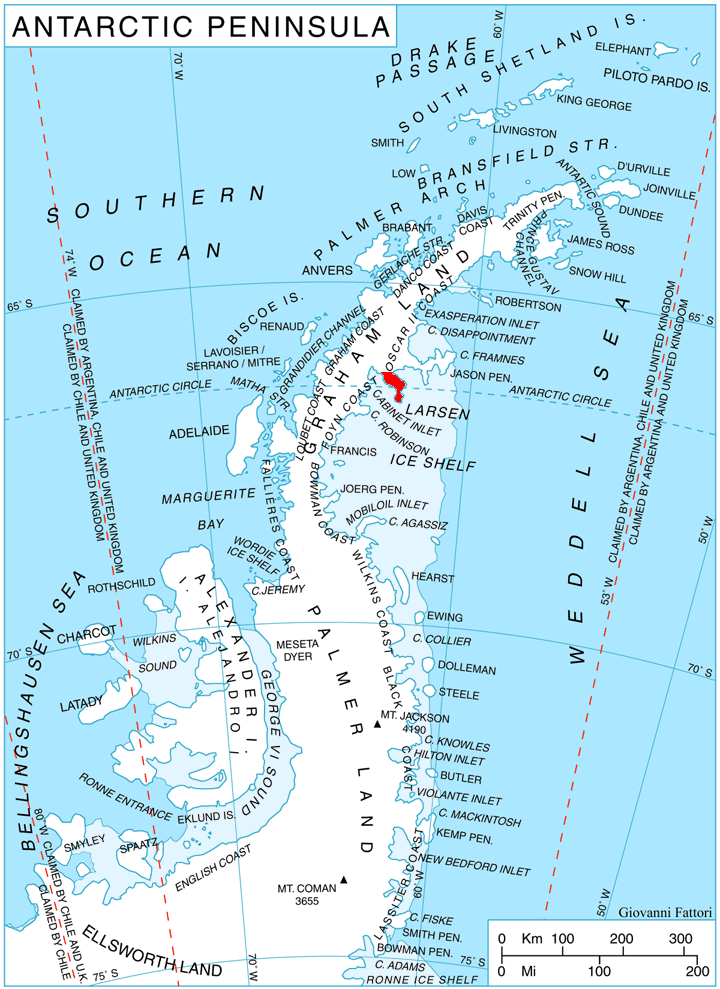
Location of Churchill Peninsula in Graham Land, Antarctic Peninsula.

Cape Alexander (66°44′S 62°37′W) is a cape which forms the south end of Churchill Peninsula and the east side of the entrance to Cabinet Inlet, on the east coast of Graham Land. It was charted by the Falkland Islands Dependencies Survey (FIDS) and photographed from the air by the Ronne Antarctic Research Expedition (RARE) in December 1947.

Cape Alexander was named by the FIDS for Rt. Hon. Albert V. Alexander, M.P., First Lord of the Admiralty.
