= Churchill Peninsula =

Ice-covered peninsula in Actarctica

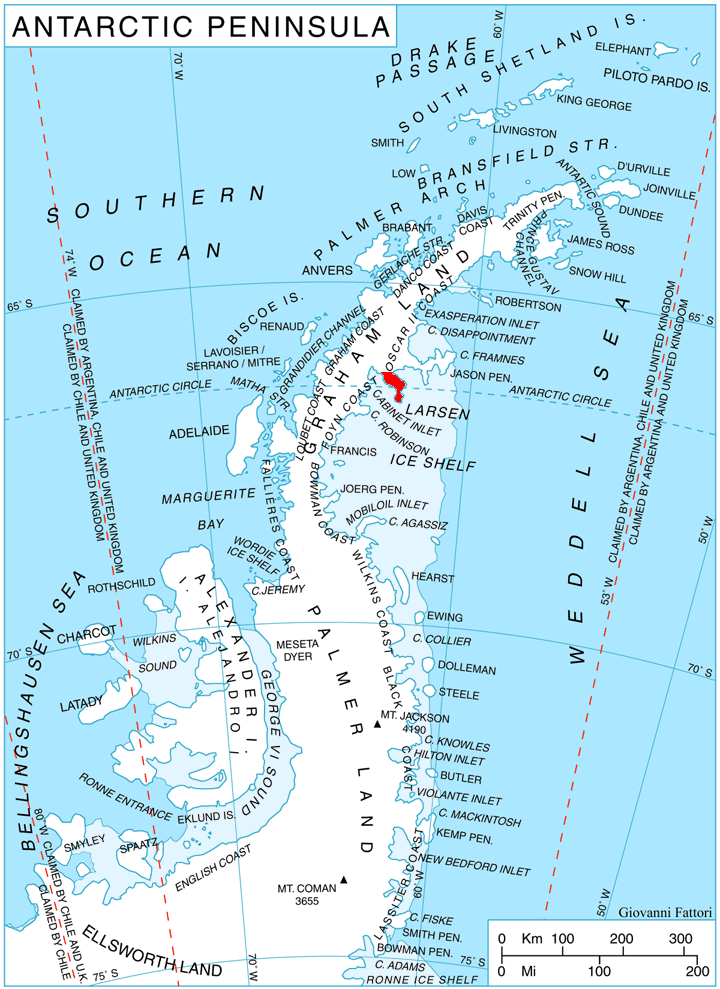
Location of Churchill Peninsula in Graham Land, Antarctic Peninsula.

Churchill Peninsula (66°30′S 62°45′W) is an ice-covered peninsula between Cabinet Inlet and Adie Inlet, extending some 30 miles (50 km) in a southeasterly direction from the east coast of Graham Land. The peninsula ends in Cape Alexander separating Oscar II Coast to the northeast from Foyn Coast to the southwest, and has its east coast indented by Zimen Inlet and Brentopara Inlet.

The feature was photographed from the air by the Ronne Antarctic Research Expedition and charted from the ground by the Falkland Islands Dependencies Survey (FIDS) during 1947. It was named by FIDS for Rt. Hon. (later Sir) Winston Churchill, M.P., Prime Minister of the United Kingdom and leader of the War Cabinet which authorized FIDS in 1943.

== Maps ==
- British Antarctic Territory: Graham Land. Scale 1:250000 topographic map. BAS 250 Series, Sheet SQ 19–20. London, 1974.
- Antarctic Digital Database (ADD). Scale 1:250000 topographic map of Antarctica. Scientific Committee on Antarctic Research (SCAR), 1993–2016.
