= Fleece Glacier =

Glacier in Antarctica

Fleece Glacier (65°54′S 63°10′W) is a tributary glacier that enters Leppard Glacier on its north side about 1.5 nautical miles (3 km) east of Moider Peak, on the east side of Graham Land, Antarctica. The toponym is one in a group applied in the vicinity by the UK Antarctic Place-Names Committee that reflects a whaling theme, Fleece being the cook aboard the Pequod in Herman Melville's Moby-Dick.
