= Adie Inlet =

Body of water in Graham Land, Antarctica

Location of Oscar II Coast on Antarctic Peninsula.

Adie Inlet (66°25′S 62°20′W) is an ice-filled inlet, 25 miles (40 km) long in a northwest–southeast direction, lying east of Churchill Peninsula along the east coast of Graham Land. Charted by the Falkland Islands Dependencies Survey (FIDS) and photographed from the air by the Ronne Antarctic Research Expedition (RARE) during 1947. Named by the FIDS for R.J. Adie, South African geologist with FIDS, 1947–49.
