= Leppard Glacier =

Glacier in Antarctica

Location of Oscar II Coast on Antarctic Peninsula.

Leppard Glacier (65°58′S 62°30′W) is a large valley glacier draining east between the Aristotle Mountains and Voden Heights, and flowing into Scar Inlet north of Ishmael Peak, on the east coast of Graham Land, Antarctica. The glacier was first seen from the air and photographed in part by Hubert Wilkins on December 20, 1928, and was surveyed by the Falkland Islands Dependencies Survey (FIDS) in 1955. It is now clear that, on the photographic evidence of his outward flight, Wilkins gave the name "Crane Channel" to this glacier, and that on his return flight he photographed what is now accepted as Crane Glacier, perhaps thinking that it was the same feature. Since Crane Glacier has been retained for the northern of these glaciers photographed by Wilkins, the UK Antarctic Place-Names Committee has named this feature for Norman A.G. Leppard, assistant surveyor with the FIDS, who surveyed this area in 1955.

== See also ==
- List of glaciers in the Antarctic
