= Voden Heights =

Location of Oscar II Coast on Antarctic Peninsula.

Voden Heights (Bulgarian: Воденски възвишения, ‘Vodenski Vazvisheniya’ \'vo-den-ski v&z-vi-'she-ni-ya\) are the heights extending 42.5 km in the east–west direction and 15.4 km wide, rising to 1700 m (Mount Zadruga) on Oscar II Coast in Graham Land. They are bounded by Flask Glacier to the north, Scar Inlet to the east, Leppard Glacier to the south and its tributary Fleece Glacier to the southwest, and linked by a wide ice-covered saddle to Bruce Plateau to the west. The feature is named after the settlements of Voden in Northeastern, Southeastern, and Southern Bulgaria.

== Location ==
Voden Heights are centred at 65°50′40″S 62°50′40″W. British mapping in 1976.

== Maps ==
- British Antarctic Territory. Scale 1:200000 topographic map. DOS 610 Series, Sheet W 65 62. Directorate of Overseas Surveys, Tolworth, UK, 1976.
- Antarctic Digital Database (ADD). Scale 1:250000 topographic map of Antarctica. Scientific Committee on Antarctic Research (SCAR). Since 1993, regularly upgraded and updated.

== See also ==
- Spermwhale Ridge
