= Metatrogus castaneus =

Scientific classification
- Kingdom: Animalia
- Phylum: Arthropoda
- Clade: Pancrustacea
- Class: Insecta
- Order: Coleoptera
- Suborder: Polyphaga
- Infraorder: Scarabaeiformia
- Family: Scarabaeidae
- Tribe: Melolonthini
- Genus: Metatrogus
- Species: M. castaneus

Binomial name
- Metatrogus castaneus Britton, 1978

Species of beetle

Metatrogus castaneus is a species of beetle of the family Scarabaeidae. It is found in Australia (Queensland).

== Description ==
Adults reach a length of about 23 mm (0.91 in). They are similar to Metatrogus septuosus, but may be distinguished by the bright reddish-brown colour, the different antennal club, and the absence of any trace of an anterior pronotal margin.
