= Pentelia crinifrons =

Scientific classification
- Kingdom: Animalia
- Phylum: Arthropoda
- Clade: Pancrustacea
- Class: Insecta
- Order: Coleoptera
- Suborder: Polyphaga
- Infraorder: Scarabaeiformia
- Family: Scarabaeidae
- Tribe: Melolonthini
- Genus: Pentelia
- Species: P. crinifrons

Binomial name
- Pentelia crinifrons Moser, 1912

Species of beetle

Pentelia crinifrons is a species of beetle of the family Scarabaeidae. It is found in Malaysia (Sarawak).

== Description ==
Adults reach a length of about 22 mm (0.87 in). They are reddish-brown, with the head and pronotum somewhat darker. The clypeus, and especially the frons, is wrinkled and hairy, the latter with erect yellow hairs. The antennae are brown. The pronotum is moderately densely and rather strongly punctate, with a smooth midline in the posterior half. The sides are arched slightly behind the middle, the posterior angles are rounded, the obtuse anterior angles are weakly projecting, and the lateral margins are crenate and fringed with yellow hairs. The scutellum bears a few punctures in the middle. The elytral punctation is quite strong and ribs are absent except for the sutural ribs, which extend to the scutellum. The pygidium is coarsely punctate and somewhat wrinkled. The chest is covered with yellow hairs, the abdomen widely punctate in the middle, becoming somewhat more densely punctate on the sides.
