= Syngeneschiza omrramba =

Scientific classification
- Kingdom: Animalia
- Phylum: Arthropoda
- Clade: Pancrustacea
- Class: Insecta
- Order: Coleoptera
- Suborder: Polyphaga
- Infraorder: Scarabaeiformia
- Family: Scarabaeidae
- Tribe: Melolonthini
- Genus: Syngeneschiza
- Species: S. omrramba

Binomial name
- Syngeneschiza omrramba Péringuey, 1904

Species of beetle

Syngeneschiza omrramba is a species of beetle of the family Scarabaeidae. It is found in Namibia.

== Description ==
Adults reach a length of about 10 mm (0.39 in). They are very pale testaceous, sub-livid, but with the sutural part of the elytra slightly, and the frontal part deeply infuscate. The antennae and legs have the same colour as the body. Both the clypeus and frontal part are covered with broad, irregular, briefly setigerous punctures. The pronotum has moderately closely set punctures, while on the parallel elytra, the punctures are somewhat broad, and separated from each other by an interval slightly narrower than their own diameter. The pygidium is fairly deeply but not closely set.
