= Hypothyce osburni =

Scientific classification
- Kingdom: Animalia
- Phylum: Arthropoda
- Clade: Pancrustacea
- Class: Insecta
- Order: Coleoptera
- Suborder: Polyphaga
- Infraorder: Scarabaeiformia
- Family: Scarabaeidae
- Tribe: Melolonthini
- Genus: Hypothyce
- Species: H. osburni

Binomial name
- Hypothyce osburni (Cartwright, 1967)

Synonyms
- Thyce osburni Cartwright, 1967

Species of beetle

Hypothyce osburni is a species of beetle of the family Scarabaeidae. It is found in Georgia.

== Description ==
Adults reach a length of about 20–23 mm (0.79–0.91 in). They have a nearly black body, while the elytra are rich brown. They are covered with dense white pubescence and the pronotum has a distinct stripe of white hairs. There are also white hairs on the scutellum and ventral thorax.
