= Pseudholophylla lepidoptera =

Scientific classification
- Kingdom: Animalia
- Phylum: Arthropoda
- Clade: Pancrustacea
- Class: Insecta
- Order: Coleoptera
- Suborder: Polyphaga
- Infraorder: Scarabaeiformia
- Family: Scarabaeidae
- Tribe: Melolonthini
- Genus: Pseudholophylla
- Species: P. lepidoptera

Binomial name
- Pseudholophylla lepidoptera (Blackburn, 1912)

Synonyms
- Paralepidiota lepidoptera Blackburn, 1912

Species of beetle

Pseudholophylla lepidoptera is a species of beetle of the family Scarabaeidae. It is found in Australia (Cape York Peninsula of Queensland).

== Description ==
Adults reach a length of about 23 mm (0.91 in) for males and 27 mm (1.1 in) for females. The body is reddish-brown with white scales.
