= Anisopholis affinis =

Scientific classification
- Kingdom: Animalia
- Phylum: Arthropoda
- Clade: Pancrustacea
- Class: Insecta
- Order: Coleoptera
- Suborder: Polyphaga
- Infraorder: Scarabaeiformia
- Family: Scarabaeidae
- Tribe: Melolonthini
- Genus: Anisopholis
- Species: A. affinis

Binomial name
- Anisopholis affinis Moser, 1914

Species of beetle

Anisopholis affinis is a species of beetle of the family Scarabaeidae. It is found in Indonesia (Java).

== Description ==
Adults reach a length of about 10–11 mm (0.39–0.43 in). They are black or reddish-brown. In addition to the suture rib, each elytron has two distinct, smooth ribs on the disc. On the head, pronotum, and elytra, there are widely spaced whitish or yellowish scales, and larger, interspersed scales which are more prominent on the elytra. The smaller scales on the elytra are minuscule. The scales on the pygidium are small and widely spaced.
