= Pseudholophylla soror =

Scientific classification
- Kingdom: Animalia
- Phylum: Arthropoda
- Clade: Pancrustacea
- Class: Insecta
- Order: Coleoptera
- Suborder: Polyphaga
- Infraorder: Scarabaeiformia
- Family: Scarabaeidae
- Tribe: Melolonthini
- Genus: Pseudholophylla
- Species: P. soror

Binomial name
- Pseudholophylla soror Britton, 1978

Species of beetle

Pseudholophylla soror is a species of beetle of the family Scarabaeidae. It is found in Australia (coastal north-western Western Australia).

== Description ==
Adults reach a length of about 17–21 mm (0.67–0.83 in). The head is piceous and the pronotum is piceous on the disc, but reddish towards the margins. The scutellum is reddish-brown, and the elytra and abdomen are yellowish-brown.
