= Amblonoxia fieldi =

Scientific classification
- Kingdom: Animalia
- Phylum: Arthropoda
- Clade: Pancrustacea
- Class: Insecta
- Order: Coleoptera
- Suborder: Polyphaga
- Infraorder: Scarabaeiformia
- Family: Scarabaeidae
- Tribe: Melolonthini
- Genus: Amblonoxia
- Species: A. fieldi

Binomial name
- Amblonoxia fieldi (Fall, 1908)

Synonyms
- Thyce angusticollis Casey, 1914; Thyce simplicipes Casey, 1914

Species of beetle

Amblonoxia fieldi is a species of scarab beetle in the family Scarabaeidae.
