= Carlschoenherria hadsallae =

Scientific classification
- Kingdom: Animalia
- Phylum: Arthropoda
- Clade: Pancrustacea
- Class: Insecta
- Order: Coleoptera
- Suborder: Polyphaga
- Infraorder: Scarabaeiformia
- Family: Scarabaeidae
- Tribe: Melolonthini
- Genus: Carlschoenherria
- Species: C. hadsallae

Binomial name
- Carlschoenherria hadsallae Calcetas, 2019

Species of beetle

Carlschoenherria hadsallae is a species of beetle of the family Scarabaeidae. It is found in the Philippines (Luzon).

== Description ==
Adults reach a length of about 20.5–21 mm (0.81–0.83 in). They have a dichromatic, dark reddish brown body. The elytra are covered with brown setae and the legs are dark alutaceous.

== Etymology ==
The species is named after Prof. Annalee S. Hadsall, Assistant Professor, Plant Biology Division, Institute of Biological Sciences, University of the Philippines Los Baños.
