= Tocama huangjianbini =

Scientific classification
- Kingdom: Animalia
- Phylum: Arthropoda
- Clade: Pancrustacea
- Class: Insecta
- Order: Coleoptera
- Suborder: Polyphaga
- Infraorder: Scarabaeiformia
- Family: Scarabaeidae
- Tribe: Melolonthini
- Genus: Tocama
- Species: T. huangjianbini

Binomial name
- Tocama huangjianbini Wang, 2022

Species of beetle

Tocama huangjianbini is a species of beetle of the family Scarabaeidae. It is found in China (Fujian).

== Description ==
Adults reach a length of about 16.2 mm (0.64 in). They have an elongate-ovoid body. The head, pronotum, scutellum and abdomen are dark brown to blackish brown, the pronotum is brown, and the antennae and legs are dark reddish brown.

== Etymology ==
The species is named after Jian-Bin Huang, who collected the types.
