= Tocama tonkinensis =

Scientific classification
- Kingdom: Animalia
- Phylum: Arthropoda
- Clade: Pancrustacea
- Class: Insecta
- Order: Coleoptera
- Suborder: Polyphaga
- Infraorder: Scarabaeiformia
- Family: Scarabaeidae
- Tribe: Melolonthini
- Genus: Tocama
- Species: T. tonkinensis

Binomial name
- Tocama tonkinensis (Moser, 1913)

Synonyms
- Hoplosternus tonkinensis Moser, 1913; Tocama atra reichenbachi Keith, 2008; Tocama atra Keith, 2006; Hoplosternus pygidialis Moser, 1915

Species of beetle

Tocama tonkinensis is a species of beetle of the family Scarabaeidae. It is found in China (Guangxi, Guizhou, Hunan, Shandong, Yunnan), Cambodia, Laos, Myanmar and Vietnam.

== Description ==
Adults reach a length of about 24 mm (0.94 in). They are sexually dimorphic, particularly with regard to the shape of the pygidium. Additionally, the intraspecific variation is significant in body colour. There are two main forms of body colour, black and castaneous.
