= Carlschoenherria adoradae =

Scientific classification
- Kingdom: Animalia
- Phylum: Arthropoda
- Clade: Pancrustacea
- Class: Insecta
- Order: Coleoptera
- Suborder: Polyphaga
- Infraorder: Scarabaeiformia
- Family: Scarabaeidae
- Tribe: Melolonthini
- Genus: Carlschoenherria
- Species: C. adoradae

Binomial name
- Carlschoenherria adoradae Calcetas, 2019

Species of beetle

Carlschoenherria adoradae is a species of beetle of the family Scarabaeidae. It is found in the Philippines (Luzon).

== Description ==
Adults reach a length of about 20.5 mm (0.81 in). They have a dichromatic body, with the head, pronotum and scutellum dark reddish-brown, covered with short, brownish to whitish setae. The elytra are light reddish brown, covered with short brownish to yellowish setae, with a few short whitish scales. The legs are black.

== Etymology ==
The species is named after Dr. Jessamyn R. Adorada, professor of taxonomy and systematics at the University of the Philippines, Los Baños.
