= Allophyllus pentaphyllus =

Scientific classification
- Kingdom: Animalia
- Phylum: Arthropoda
- Clade: Pancrustacea
- Class: Insecta
- Order: Coleoptera
- Suborder: Polyphaga
- Infraorder: Scarabaeiformia
- Family: Scarabaeidae
- Tribe: Melolonthini
- Genus: Allophyllus
- Species: A. pentaphyllus

Binomial name
- Allophyllus pentaphyllus Heller, 1916

Species of beetle

Allophyllus pentaphyllus is a species of beetle of the family Scarabaeidae. It is found in New Caledonia.

== Description ==
Adults reach a length of about 13.5–18 mm (0.53–0.71 in). They have an oval, convex, brownish-yellow body, which is darkened towards the front, The legs are brown and the antennae are yellowish.
