= Hypothyce mixta =

Scientific classification
- Kingdom: Animalia
- Phylum: Arthropoda
- Clade: Pancrustacea
- Class: Insecta
- Order: Coleoptera
- Suborder: Polyphaga
- Infraorder: Scarabaeiformia
- Family: Scarabaeidae
- Tribe: Melolonthini
- Genus: Hypothyce
- Species: H. mixta

Binomial name
- Hypothyce mixta Howden, 1968

Species of beetle

Hypothyce mixta is a species of scarab beetle in the family Scarabaeidae. It is found in North America, where it has been recorded from sandy soils in eastern Texas.
