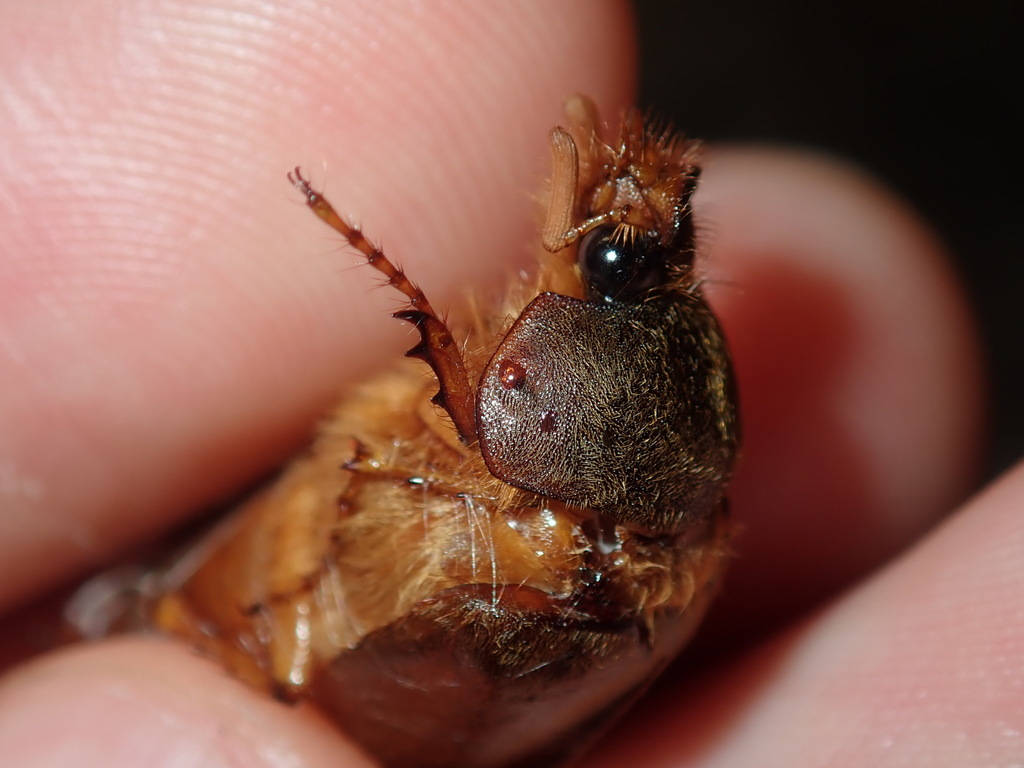

Scientific classification
- Kingdom: Animalia
- Phylum: Arthropoda
- Clade: Pancrustacea
- Class: Insecta
- Order: Coleoptera
- Suborder: Polyphaga
- Infraorder: Scarabaeiformia
- Family: Scarabaeidae
- Tribe: Melolonthini
- Genus: Rhopaea
- Species: R. verreauxii

Binomial name
- Rhopaea verreauxii Blanchard, 1851

= Rhopaea verreauxii =

Species of beetle

Rhopaea verreauxii, the cocksfoot grub, is a species of beetle of the family Scarabaeidae. It is found in Australia (New South Wales, southern Queensland).

== Description ==
Adults reach a length of about 19–29 mm (0.75–1.14 in). They are brown or dark brown with the anterior part of the clypeus and lateral margins of the pronotum reddish. The antennae, legs and ventral surface are yellowish-brown.
