= Pentelia malaccensis =

Scientific classification
- Kingdom: Animalia
- Phylum: Arthropoda
- Clade: Pancrustacea
- Class: Insecta
- Order: Coleoptera
- Suborder: Polyphaga
- Infraorder: Scarabaeiformia
- Family: Scarabaeidae
- Tribe: Melolonthini
- Genus: Pentelia
- Species: P. malaccensis

Binomial name
- Pentelia malaccensis Moser, 1912

Synonyms
- Neopentelia malaccensis apicalis Matsumoto, 2005

Species of beetle

Pentelia malaccensis is a species of beetle of the family Scarabaeidae. It is found in Malaysia.

== Description ==
Adults reach a length of about 22 mm (0.87 in). They are chestnut brown, with the head slightly darker. The clypeus is coarsely punctate, the punctures becoming more widely spaced towards the margin. The antennae are yellowish-brown, with a lighter club. The pronotum is moderately densely punctate, the punctures being somewhat coarser at the anterior margin, and the sides are rather strongly arched behind the middle. The posterior angles are very obtuse, almost rounded, and the anterior angles are obtuse, barely projecting. The scutellum is punctate except for the margin and a midline. The elytra are coarsely but not very densely punctate and the sutural rib is almost smooth and does not reach the scutellum. Further ribs are barely distinguishable by more widely spaced punctures. The pygidium is widely punctured and weakly wrinkled. The chest is covered with yellow hairs, the abdomen is very widely punctured in the middle, and somewhat more densely along the sides.

== Subspecies ==
- Pentelia malaccensis malaccensis (Malaysia: mainland, Malacca)
- Pentelia malaccensis apicalis (Matsumoto, 2005) (Malaysia: Sarawak)
