= Homoeoschiza flavescens =

Scientific classification
- Kingdom: Animalia
- Phylum: Arthropoda
- Clade: Pancrustacea
- Class: Insecta
- Order: Coleoptera
- Suborder: Polyphaga
- Infraorder: Scarabaeiformia
- Family: Scarabaeidae
- Tribe: Melolonthini
- Genus: Homoeoschiza
- Species: H. flavescens

Binomial name
- Homoeoschiza flavescens Brenske, 1897

Species of beetle

Homoeoschiza flavescens is a species of beetle of the family Scarabaeidae. It is found in Tanzania.

== Description ==
Adults reach a length of about 12.5 mm (0.49 in). They are yellow, and covered with fine white scale-like hairs. The tarsi are very long and slender and the claws are finely split at the tip, with the outer tooth being the finer one.
