= Pararhopaea moffatensis =

Scientific classification
- Kingdom: Animalia
- Phylum: Arthropoda
- Clade: Pancrustacea
- Class: Insecta
- Order: Coleoptera
- Suborder: Polyphaga
- Infraorder: Scarabaeiformia
- Family: Scarabaeidae
- Tribe: Melolonthini
- Genus: Pararhopaea
- Species: P. moffatensis

Binomial name
- Pararhopaea moffatensis Allsopp, 1990

Species of beetle

Pararhopaea moffatensis is a species of beetle of the family Scarabaeidae. It is found in Australia (central Queensland).

== Description ==
Adults reach a length of about 18 mm (0.71 in). The head, pronotum and scutellum are reddish-brown, while the elytra and legs are lighter brown. The venter is yellowish brown and the antennae are paler.

== Etymology ==
The species is named after the type locality, Mount Moffat.
