= Alepida ultima =

Scientific classification
- Kingdom: Animalia
- Phylum: Arthropoda
- Clade: Pancrustacea
- Class: Insecta
- Order: Coleoptera
- Suborder: Polyphaga
- Infraorder: Scarabaeiformia
- Family: Scarabaeidae
- Tribe: Melolonthini
- Genus: Alepida
- Species: A. ultima

Binomial name
- Alepida ultima (Britton, 1978)

Synonyms
- Lepidiota ultima Britton, 1978

Species of beetle

Alepida ultima is a species of beetle of the family Scarabaeidae. It is found in Australia (Cape York Peninsula, Queensland).

== Description ==
Adults reach a length of about 24 mm (0.94 in). The body and legs are reddish brown with white dorsal pubescence.

== Life history ==
Adults have been recorded from September to December.
