= Syngeneschiza tarsata =

Scientific classification
- Kingdom: Animalia
- Phylum: Arthropoda
- Clade: Pancrustacea
- Class: Insecta
- Order: Coleoptera
- Suborder: Polyphaga
- Infraorder: Scarabaeiformia
- Family: Scarabaeidae
- Tribe: Melolonthini
- Genus: Syngeneschiza
- Species: S. tarsata

Binomial name
- Syngeneschiza tarsata Brenske, 1898

Species of beetle

Syngeneschiza tarsata is a species of beetle of the family Scarabaeidae. It is found in Tanzania.

== Description ==
Adults reach a length of about 9 mm (0.35 in). They are yellowish-brown above, with the frons and the middle of the pronotum darker. The clypeus is flatly rounded, dully punctate, and the frons densely punctate. The pronotum is short, slightly emarginate anteriorly, the anterior angles broadly rounded, the sides slightly projecting, rather strongly punctate. The elytra are densely punctate. The pygidium is shortened, broad, almost densely punctate. The abdomen is depressed in the middle.
