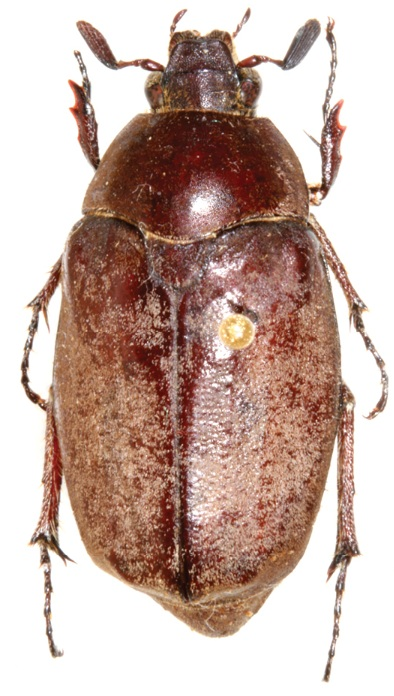
- Male
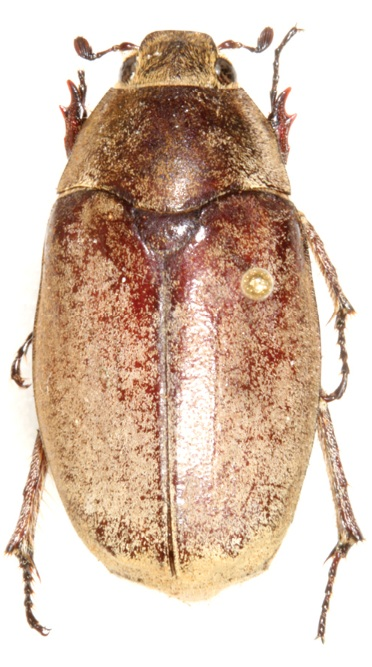
- Female

Scientific classification
- Kingdom: Animalia
- Phylum: Arthropoda
- Clade: Pancrustacea
- Class: Insecta
- Order: Coleoptera
- Suborder: Polyphaga
- Infraorder: Scarabaeiformia
- Family: Scarabaeidae
- Tribe: Melolonthini
- Genus: Tocama
- Species: T. procera

Binomial name
- Tocama procera Li & Keith, 2012

= Tocama procera =

Species of beetle

Tocama procera is a species of beetle of the family Scarabaeidae. It is found in Vietnam.

== Description ==
Adults reach a length of about 20.3–22.9 mm (0.80–0.90 in). The head, antennae, pronotum, scutellum and venter of the body are blackish brown, while the tarsomeres are black and the elytra dull castaneous. The dorsal surface of the body is covered with minute, brownish grey setae.

== Etymology ==
The species name is derived from Latin procera (meaning tall) and refers to the relatively convex pronotum when viewed laterally.
