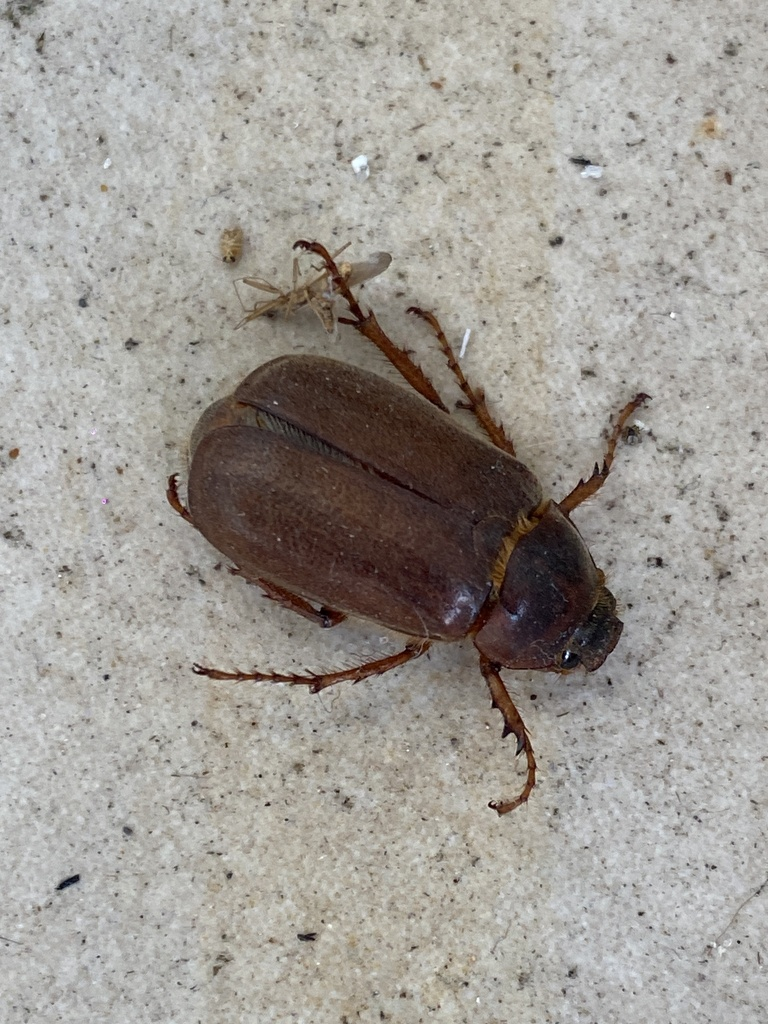

Scientific classification
- Kingdom: Animalia
- Phylum: Arthropoda
- Clade: Pancrustacea
- Class: Insecta
- Order: Coleoptera
- Suborder: Polyphaga
- Infraorder: Scarabaeiformia
- Family: Scarabaeidae
- Tribe: Melolonthini
- Genus: Rhopaea
- Species: R. magnicornis

Binomial name
- Rhopaea magnicornis Blackburn, 1888

= Rhopaea magnicornis =

Species of beetle

Rhopaea magnicornis, the brown cockchafer, is a species of beetle of the family Scarabaeidae. It is found in Australia (southern Queensland, northern New South Wales).

== Description ==
Adults reach a length of about 21–30 mm (0.83–1.18 in). The body is dark brown, while the antennae and legs are reddish-brown.

== Life history ==
They are considered a pest species, damaging pastures and attacking the roots of sugarcane, arrowroot and pineapple.
