= Allothnonius brooksi =

Scientific classification
- Kingdom: Animalia
- Phylum: Arthropoda
- Clade: Pancrustacea
- Class: Insecta
- Order: Coleoptera
- Suborder: Polyphaga
- Infraorder: Scarabaeiformia
- Family: Scarabaeidae
- Tribe: Melolonthini
- Genus: Allothnonius
- Species: A. brooksi

Binomial name
- Allothnonius brooksi Britton, 1978

Species of beetle

Allothnonius brooksi is a species of beetle of the family Scarabaeidae. It is found in Australia (coastal northern Queensland).

== Description ==
Adults reach a length of about 11–14 mm (0.43–0.55 in). The head, pronotum, scutellum and ventral side of the thorax are black, while the elytra are dark reddish-brown and the antennae pale yellowish-brown (but the scape is sometimes brownish).
