= Tocama hebeica =

Scientific classification
- Kingdom: Animalia
- Phylum: Arthropoda
- Clade: Pancrustacea
- Class: Insecta
- Order: Coleoptera
- Suborder: Polyphaga
- Infraorder: Scarabaeiformia
- Family: Scarabaeidae
- Tribe: Melolonthini
- Genus: Tocama
- Species: T. hebeica

Binomial name
- Tocama hebeica Keith & Sabatinelli, 2012

Species of beetle

Tocama hebeica is a species of beetle of the family Scarabaeidae. It is found in China (Hebei, Hubei, Jiangxi).

== Description ==
Adults reach a length of about 18–19 mm (0.71–0.75 in). They have an oval body. They are distinctly bicolored, with the anterior body and scutellum black, and the elytra reddish-brown. The underside is black and the appendages are blackish to brownish.

== Etymology ==
The species name refers to the geographical origin of the first specimens studied, the Chinese province of Hebei.
