= Sebakue coriacea =

Scientific classification
- Kingdom: Animalia
- Phylum: Arthropoda
- Clade: Pancrustacea
- Class: Insecta
- Order: Coleoptera
- Suborder: Polyphaga
- Infraorder: Scarabaeiformia
- Family: Scarabaeidae
- Tribe: Melolonthini
- Genus: Sebakue
- Species: S. coriacea

Binomial name
- Sebakue coriacea Péringuey, 1904

Species of beetle

Sebakue coriacea is a species of beetle of the family Scarabaeidae. It is found in the Democratic Republic of the Congo and Zimbabwe.

== Description ==
Adults reach a length of about 18–20 mm (0.71–0.79 in). They are chestnut-brown, turning sometimes to ferruginous. They are glabrous on the upper side, but with the mouth parts and the pectus, the metasternum especially, densely hairy. The head is scrobiculate, separated by a sinuate, transverse, somewhat indistinct impressed line from the clypeus, which is shorter, has strongly reflexed margins, and is deeply emarginate in the centre. The pronotum is covered with very closely set, deep, round punctures which are separated from each other by a space narrower than their own diameter, and the outer margin is reflexed and strongly serrate from the anterior angle to the median part, but carinate from there to the sharp basal angle, and the anterior is briefly hairy in the centre. The scutellum is closely and deeply punctate and the elytra are plainly tri-costate on each side and with the suture also plainly raised, the whole surface is covered with nearly confluent, deep punctures, giving to the elytra a very coriaceous appearance. The propygidium and pygidium are very closely punctured, the latter somewhat convex, glabrous along the edges except for a few short setae at the apex. The abdomen is closely punctulate and glabrous.
