= Barryfilius quinarius =

Scientific classification
- Kingdom: Animalia
- Phylum: Arthropoda
- Clade: Pancrustacea
- Class: Insecta
- Order: Coleoptera
- Suborder: Polyphaga
- Infraorder: Scarabaeiformia
- Family: Scarabaeidae
- Tribe: Melolonthini
- Genus: Barryfilius
- Species: B. quinarius

Binomial name
- Barryfilius quinarius (Britton, 1978)

Synonyms
- Lepidiota quinaria Britton, 1978

Species of beetle

Barryfilius quinarius is a species of beetle of the family Scarabaeidae. It is found in Australia (north-eastern Queensland).

== Description ==
Adults reach a length of about 23–26 mm (0.91–1.02 in). They are uniformly dark reddish-brown.

== Life history ==
Adults have been collected in October and from December to January.
