= Allophyllus tetraphyllus =

Scientific classification
- Kingdom: Animalia
- Phylum: Arthropoda
- Clade: Pancrustacea
- Class: Insecta
- Order: Coleoptera
- Suborder: Polyphaga
- Infraorder: Scarabaeiformia
- Family: Scarabaeidae
- Tribe: Melolonthini
- Genus: Allophyllus
- Species: A. tetraphyllus

Binomial name
- Allophyllus tetraphyllus Fauvel, 1903

Species of beetle

Allophyllus tetraphyllus is a species of beetle of the family Scarabaeidae. It is found in New Caledonia.

== Description ==
Adults reach a length of about 16–19 mm (0.63–0.75 in). They have an elongated, subcylindrical, dull brownish-black body. The antennae and elytra (except for the suture) are reddish.
