= Pararhopaea rhipidocera =

Scientific classification
- Kingdom: Animalia
- Phylum: Arthropoda
- Clade: Pancrustacea
- Class: Insecta
- Order: Coleoptera
- Suborder: Polyphaga
- Infraorder: Scarabaeiformia
- Family: Scarabaeidae
- Tribe: Melolonthini
- Genus: Pararhopaea
- Species: P. rhipidocera

Binomial name
- Pararhopaea rhipidocera Lea, 1916

Species of beetle

Pararhopaea rhipidocera is a species of beetle of the family Scarabaeidae. It is found in Australia (Western Australia).

== Description ==
Adults reach a length of about 20–25 mm (0.79–0.98 in). They are bright reddish-brown.
