= Alepida helleri =

Scientific classification
- Kingdom: Animalia
- Phylum: Arthropoda
- Clade: Pancrustacea
- Class: Insecta
- Order: Coleoptera
- Suborder: Polyphaga
- Infraorder: Scarabaeiformia
- Family: Scarabaeidae
- Tribe: Melolonthini
- Genus: Alepida
- Species: A. helleri

Binomial name
- Alepida helleri (Moser, 1913)

Synonyms
- Lepidiota helleri Moser, 1913

Species of beetle

Alepida helleri is a species of beetle of the family Scarabaeidae. It is found in Australia (Queensland).

== Description ==
Adults reach a length of about 23–34 mm (0.91–1.34 in). They are dark reddish brown.

== Life history ==
Adults have been recorded from October to January.
