= Alepida crinita =

Scientific classification
- Kingdom: Animalia
- Phylum: Arthropoda
- Clade: Pancrustacea
- Class: Insecta
- Order: Coleoptera
- Suborder: Polyphaga
- Infraorder: Scarabaeiformia
- Family: Scarabaeidae
- Tribe: Melolonthini
- Genus: Alepida
- Species: A. crinita

Binomial name
- Alepida crinita (Brenske, 1900)

Synonyms
- Lepidiota crinita Brenske, 1900; Lepidiota trichosterna Lea, 1924

Species of beetle

Alepida crinita, the bundaberg canegrub, is a species of beetle of the family Scarabaeidae. It is found in Australia (Queensland).

== Description ==
Adults reach a length of about 20–25 mm (0.79–0.98 in). They are bright reddish brown.

== Life history ==
Larvae are pests of sugarcane. Adults have been recorded from October to January.
