= Allophyllus chazeaui =

Scientific classification
- Kingdom: Animalia
- Phylum: Arthropoda
- Clade: Pancrustacea
- Class: Insecta
- Order: Coleoptera
- Suborder: Polyphaga
- Infraorder: Scarabaeiformia
- Family: Scarabaeidae
- Tribe: Melolonthini
- Genus: Allophyllus
- Species: A. chazeaui

Binomial name
- Allophyllus chazeaui Paulian, 1991

Species of beetle

Allophyllus chazeaui is a species of beetle of the family Scarabaeidae. It is found in New Caledonia.

== Description ==
Adults reach a length of about 14 mm (0.55 in). They have a rather narrow, oval, pitchy brown and shiny body. The antennae are mostly yellow.
