= Alepida hylaea =

Scientific classification
- Kingdom: Animalia
- Phylum: Arthropoda
- Clade: Pancrustacea
- Class: Insecta
- Order: Coleoptera
- Suborder: Polyphaga
- Infraorder: Scarabaeiformia
- Family: Scarabaeidae
- Tribe: Melolonthini
- Genus: Alepida
- Species: A. hylaea

Binomial name
- Alepida hylaea (Britton, 1978)

Synonyms
- Lepidiota hylaea Britton, 1978

Species of beetle

Alepida hylaea is a species of beetle of the family Scarabaeidae. It is found in Australia (Queensland).

== Description ==
Adults reach a length of about 25–34 mm (0.98–1.34 in). They are dark reddish brown, but densely covered with short, greyish setae. The legs are bright reddish brown.

== Life history ==
Adults have been recorded in September.
