= Exolontha chiangmaiensis =

Scientific classification
- Kingdom: Animalia
- Phylum: Arthropoda
- Clade: Pancrustacea
- Class: Insecta
- Order: Coleoptera
- Suborder: Polyphaga
- Infraorder: Scarabaeiformia
- Family: Scarabaeidae
- Tribe: Melolonthini
- Genus: Exolontha
- Species: E. chiangmaiensis

Binomial name
- Exolontha chiangmaiensis Keith & Sabatinelli, 2012

Species of beetle

Exolontha chiangmaiensis is a species of beetle of the family Scarabaeidae. It is found in Cambodia, Thailand, Myanmar and Laos.

== Description ==
They differ from other Exolontha species by their brown integument, the hairiness of the forebody and scutellum and their more distinctly elongated clypeus, the narrow elytral ribs which are more or less obliterated by thicker hairs, the broad triangular pygidium and especially by the shape of the parameres.

== Etymology ==
The species name refers to its geographical origin, the province of Chiang Mai.

== Subspecies ==
- Exolontha chiangmaiensis chiangmaiensis (Cambodia, Thailand)
- Exolontha chiangmaiensis shanica Keith & Sabatinelli, 2012 (Myanmar)
- Exolontha chiangmaiensis laotica Li & Keith, 2012 (Laos)
