= Pseudholophylla hurai =

Scientific classification
- Kingdom: Animalia
- Phylum: Arthropoda
- Clade: Pancrustacea
- Class: Insecta
- Order: Coleoptera
- Suborder: Polyphaga
- Infraorder: Scarabaeiformia
- Family: Scarabaeidae
- Tribe: Melolonthini
- Genus: Pseudholophylla
- Species: P. hurai

Binomial name
- Pseudholophylla hurai Hutchinson & Allsopp, 2021

Species of beetle

Pseudholophylla hurai is a species of beetle of the family Scarabaeidae. It is found in Australia (Northern Territory).

== Description ==
Adults reach a length of about 27.4–30 mm (1.08–1.18 in). The head is dark brown, while the pronotum, scutellum and elytra are brown. Both the club of the antennae and the pygidium are yellowish-brown. The scales are white.

== Etymology ==
The species is named after Mark Hura, who first collected the species.
