= Rhopaea heterodactyla =

Scientific classification
- Kingdom: Animalia
- Phylum: Arthropoda
- Clade: Pancrustacea
- Class: Insecta
- Order: Coleoptera
- Suborder: Polyphaga
- Infraorder: Scarabaeiformia
- Family: Scarabaeidae
- Tribe: Melolonthini
- Genus: Rhopaea
- Species: R. heterodactyla

Binomial name
- Rhopaea heterodactyla (Germar, 1848)

Synonyms
- Melolontha heterodactyla Germar, 1848; Rhopaea soror Blackburn, 1892

Species of beetle

Rhopaea heterodactyla is a species of beetle of the family Scarabaeidae. It is found in Australia (New South Wales, South Australia, Victoria, Queensland).

== Description ==
Adults reach a length of about 21–28 mm (0.83–1.10 in). They are uniform, rather pale yellowish-brown.
