= Pseudholophylla furfuracea =

Scientific classification
- Kingdom: Animalia
- Phylum: Arthropoda
- Clade: Pancrustacea
- Class: Insecta
- Order: Coleoptera
- Suborder: Polyphaga
- Infraorder: Scarabaeiformia
- Family: Scarabaeidae
- Tribe: Melolonthini
- Genus: Pseudholophylla
- Species: P. furfuracea

Binomial name
- Pseudholophylla furfuracea (Burmeister, 1855)

Synonyms
- Holophylla furfuracea Burmeister, 1855

Species of beetle

Pseudholophylla furfuracea is a species of beetle of the family Scarabaeidae. It is found in Australia (Queensland).

== Description ==
Adults reach a length of about 16 mm (0.63 in). The head, pronotum, elytra, legs and pygidium are dark brown, while the ventral surface is brown. The antennal scape is dark brown and the remainder of the antennae is pale yellowish-brown.
