= Allothnonius barretti =

Scientific classification
- Kingdom: Animalia
- Phylum: Arthropoda
- Clade: Pancrustacea
- Class: Insecta
- Order: Coleoptera
- Suborder: Polyphaga
- Infraorder: Scarabaeiformia
- Family: Scarabaeidae
- Tribe: Melolonthini
- Genus: Allothnonius
- Species: A. barretti

Binomial name
- Allothnonius barretti Britton, 1978

Species of beetle

Allothnonius barretti is a species of beetle of the family Scarabaeidae. It is found in Australia (Queensland).

== Description ==
Adults reach a length of about 15–17 mm (0.59–0.67 in). The head is black and the pronotum, scutellum, elytra and abdomen are reddish-brown. The pygidium is dark brown, the antennae yellowish-brown and the legs reddish-brown.
