= Barryfilius lewisae =

Scientific classification
- Kingdom: Animalia
- Phylum: Arthropoda
- Clade: Pancrustacea
- Class: Insecta
- Order: Coleoptera
- Suborder: Polyphaga
- Infraorder: Scarabaeiformia
- Family: Scarabaeidae
- Tribe: Melolonthini
- Genus: Barryfilius
- Species: B. lewisae

Binomial name
- Barryfilius lewisae (Britton, 1978)

Synonyms
- Lepidiota lewisae Britton, 1978

Species of beetle

Barryfilius lewisae is a species of beetle of the family Scarabaeidae. It is found in Australia (Mount Lewis in Queensland).

== Description ==
Adults reach a length of about 22 mm (0.87 in). They are dark reddish-brown, with the pronotum darker than the elytra.

== Life history ==
Adults have been collected in late November.
