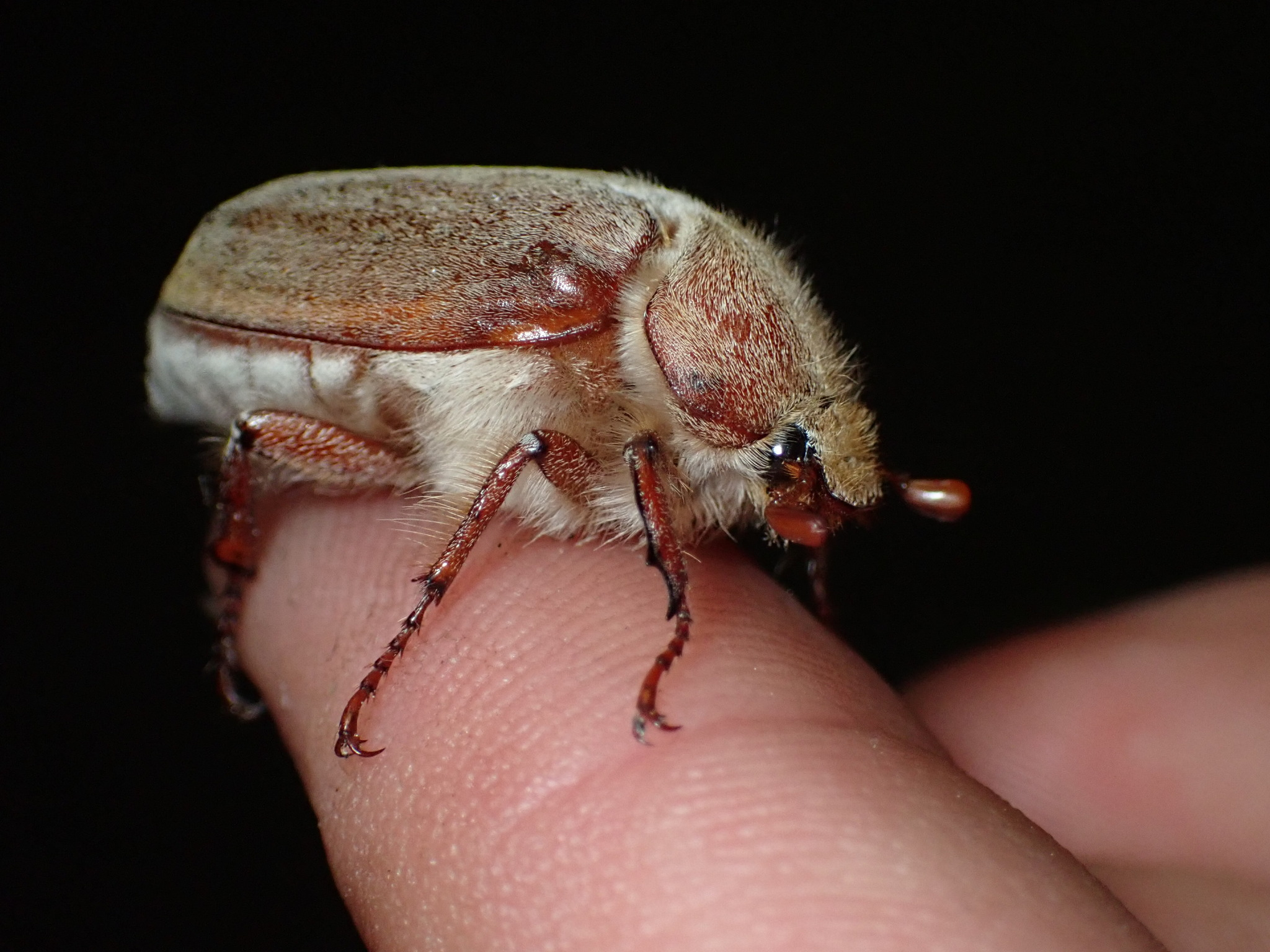

Scientific classification
- Kingdom: Animalia
- Phylum: Arthropoda
- Clade: Pancrustacea
- Class: Insecta
- Order: Coleoptera
- Suborder: Polyphaga
- Infraorder: Scarabaeiformia
- Family: Scarabaeidae
- Tribe: Melolonthini
- Genus: Amblonoxia
- Species: A. palpalis

Binomial name
- Amblonoxia palpalis (Horn, 1880)

Synonyms
- Plectrodes palpalis Horn, 1880; Thyce fossiger Casey, 1889; Thyce pulverea Casey, 1889; Thyce blaisdelli Casey, 1891; Microphylla quedenfeldtii Kraatz, 1894; Amblonoxia quedenfeldti Reitter, 1902 (Missp.); Thyce angustula Casey, 1914; Thyce aperta Casey, 1914; Thyce brevitarsis Casey, 1914; Thyce nitidula Casey, 1914; Thyce ochreata Casey, 1914; Thyce rotundicauda Casey, 1914; Thyce vestita Casey, 1914; Thyce aurata Van Dyke, 1943; Thyce cinerea Van Dyke, 1943; Thyce clypeata Van Dyke, 1943

= Amblonoxia palpalis =

Species of beetle

Amblonoxia palpalis, also known as the dusty june beetle, is a species of scarab beetle in the family Scarabaeidae. It is native to the California coastal plain in North America.
