= Barryfilius contiguus =

Scientific classification
- Kingdom: Animalia
- Phylum: Arthropoda
- Clade: Pancrustacea
- Class: Insecta
- Order: Coleoptera
- Suborder: Polyphaga
- Infraorder: Scarabaeiformia
- Family: Scarabaeidae
- Tribe: Melolonthini
- Genus: Barryfilius
- Species: B. contiguus

Binomial name
- Barryfilius contiguus (Britton, 1978)

Synonyms
- Lepidiota contigua Britton, 1978

Species of beetle

Barryfilius contiguus is a species of beetle of the family Scarabaeidae. It is found in Australia (the Windsor Tableland of Queensland).

== Description ==
Adults reach a length of about 18–20 mm (0.71–0.79 in). They are uniformly reddish-brown.

== Life history ==
Adults have been collected from December to January.
