= Phiara flava =

Scientific classification
- Kingdom: Animalia
- Phylum: Arthropoda
- Clade: Pancrustacea
- Class: Insecta
- Order: Coleoptera
- Suborder: Polyphaga
- Infraorder: Scarabaeiformia
- Family: Scarabaeidae
- Tribe: Melolonthini
- Genus: Phiara
- Species: P. flava

Binomial name
- Phiara flava Brenske, 1897

Species of beetle

Phiara flava is a species of beetle of the family Scarabaeidae. It is found in Sudan.

== Description ==
Adults reach a length of about 13 mm (0.51 in). They are yellow and glossy, with a darker head and a brownish center on the pronotum. The upper has with extremely minute hairs within the punctures and the underside is sparsely hairy.
