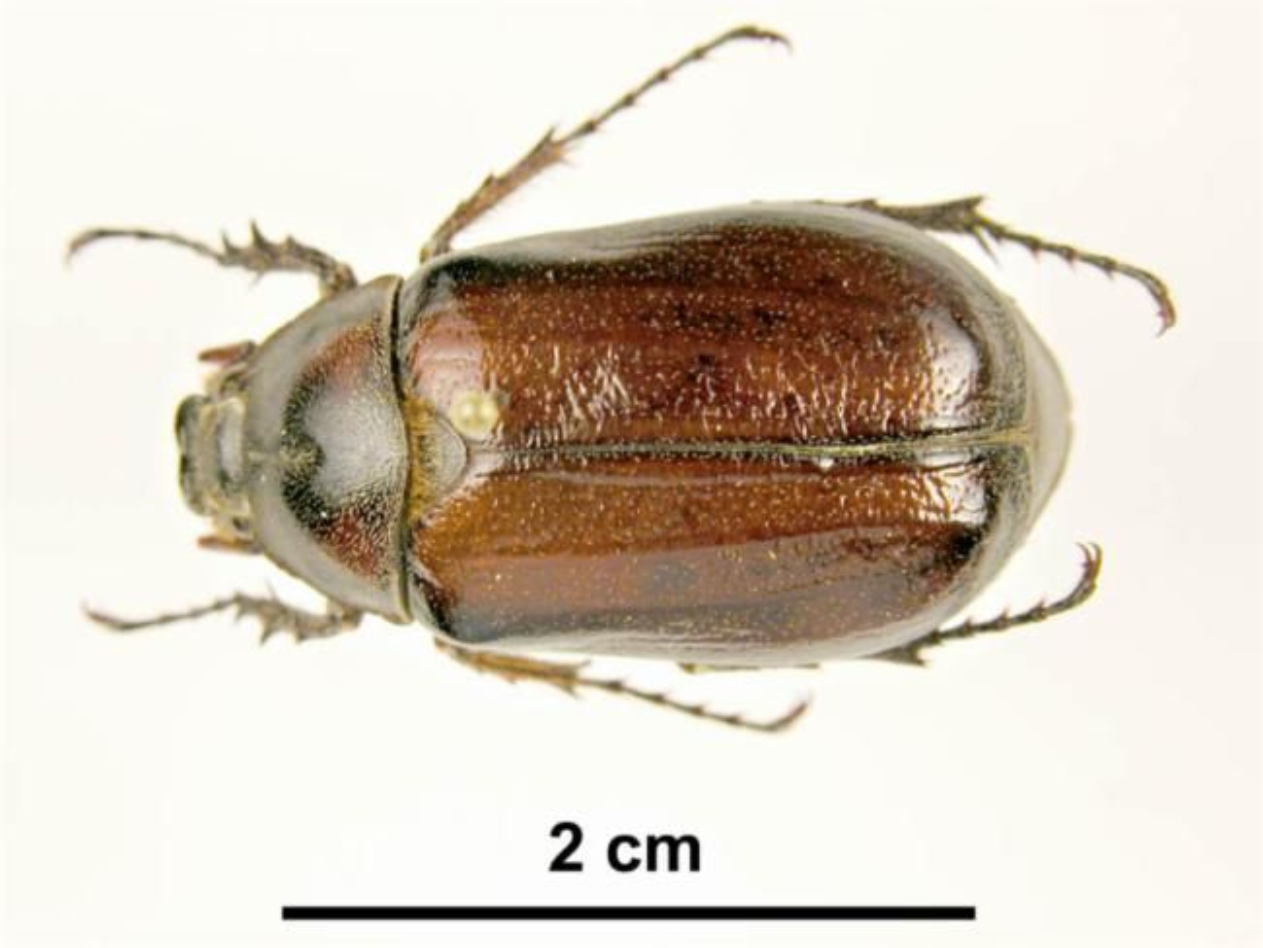

Scientific classification
- Kingdom: Animalia
- Phylum: Arthropoda
- Clade: Pancrustacea
- Class: Insecta
- Order: Coleoptera
- Suborder: Polyphaga
- Infraorder: Scarabaeiformia
- Family: Scarabaeidae
- Tribe: Melolonthini
- Genus: Alepida
- Species: A. picticollis

Binomial name
- Alepida picticollis (Lea, 1916)

Synonyms
- Lepidiota picticollis Lea, 1916

= Alepida picticollis =

Species of beetle

Alepida picticollis, the canegrub, is a species of beetle of the family Scarabaeidae. It is found in Australia (Queensland).

== Description ==
Adults reach a length of about 25–35 mm (0.98–1.38 in). The head and pronotum are black, the latter with a trace of two large, reddish-yellow areas. The scutellum is dark reddish brown to black and the elytra are yellowish or reddish brown, sometimes with the sutural and lateral margins darker. The abdomen, ventral surface and legs are dark reddish brown. There are white setae on the dorsum.

== Life history ==
The larvae are a pest of sugarcane. Adults have been recorded from September to October.
