= Pseudholophylla cavifrons =

Scientific classification
- Kingdom: Animalia
- Phylum: Arthropoda
- Clade: Pancrustacea
- Class: Insecta
- Order: Coleoptera
- Suborder: Polyphaga
- Infraorder: Scarabaeiformia
- Family: Scarabaeidae
- Tribe: Melolonthini
- Genus: Pseudholophylla
- Species: P. cavifrons

Binomial name
- Pseudholophylla cavifrons (Lea, 1919)

Synonyms
- Paralepidiota cavifrons Lea, 1919

Species of beetle

Pseudholophylla cavifrons is a species of beetle of the family Scarabaeidae. It is found in Australia (northern Queensland).

== Description ==
Adults reach a length of about 21–22 mm (0.83–0.87 in). The body is pale yellowish-brown, with white scales.
