= Rhopaea pilosa =

Scientific classification
- Kingdom: Animalia
- Phylum: Arthropoda
- Clade: Pancrustacea
- Class: Insecta
- Order: Coleoptera
- Suborder: Polyphaga
- Infraorder: Scarabaeiformia
- Family: Scarabaeidae
- Tribe: Melolonthini
- Genus: Rhopaea
- Species: R. pilosa

Binomial name
- Rhopaea pilosa Blackburn, 1911

Species of beetle

Rhopaea pilosa is a species of beetle of the family Scarabaeidae. It is found in Australia (southern New South Wales, Victoria, southern South Australia).

== Description ==
Adults reach a length of about 19–21 mm (0.75–0.83 in). The upper surface is dark brown with the lateral margins and sometimes the disc of the pronotum reddish. The antennae, ventral surface of the thorax and the legs are yellowish-brown.
