= Metatrogus praeceps =

Scientific classification
- Kingdom: Animalia
- Phylum: Arthropoda
- Clade: Pancrustacea
- Class: Insecta
- Order: Coleoptera
- Suborder: Polyphaga
- Infraorder: Scarabaeiformia
- Family: Scarabaeidae
- Tribe: Melolonthini
- Genus: Metatrogus
- Species: M. praeceps

Binomial name
- Metatrogus praeceps Britton, 1978

Species of beetle

Metatrogus praeceps is a species of beetle of the family Scarabaeidae. It is found in Australia (Queensland).

== Description ==
Adults reach a length of about 27–30 mm (1.1–1.2 in). The body is very dark brown, while the legs are dark reddish brown.

== Life history ==
Adults have mainly been collected in December.
