= Barryfilius laevis =

Scientific classification
- Kingdom: Animalia
- Phylum: Arthropoda
- Clade: Pancrustacea
- Class: Insecta
- Order: Coleoptera
- Suborder: Polyphaga
- Infraorder: Scarabaeiformia
- Family: Scarabaeidae
- Tribe: Melolonthini
- Genus: Barryfilius
- Species: B. laevis

Binomial name
- Barryfilius laevis (Arrow, 1932)

Synonyms
- Lepidiota laevis Arrow, 1932

Species of beetle

Barryfilius laevis, the paspalum whitegrub, is a species of beetle of the family Scarabaeidae. It is found in Australia (Queensland).

== Description ==
Adults reach a length of about 19–22 mm (0.75–0.87 in). They are bright reddish-brown.

== Life history ==
They are considered a pest of pastures. Adults have been collected from December to February. Records from June and October probably refer to the collection of larvae.
