= Rhopaea assimilis =

Scientific classification
- Kingdom: Animalia
- Phylum: Arthropoda
- Clade: Pancrustacea
- Class: Insecta
- Order: Coleoptera
- Suborder: Polyphaga
- Infraorder: Scarabaeiformia
- Family: Scarabaeidae
- Tribe: Melolonthini
- Genus: Rhopaea
- Species: R. assimilis

Binomial name
- Rhopaea assimilis Blackburn, 1911

Species of beetle

Rhopaea assimilis is a species of beetle of the family Scarabaeidae. It is found in Australia (New South Wales).

== Description ==
Adults reach a length of about 21–28 mm (0.83–1.10 in). They are brown or dark brown, with the pronotum often mottled reddish brown and dark brown, The antennae, legs and ventral surface are yellowish-brown.
