= Hypolepida braes =

Scientific classification
- Kingdom: Animalia
- Phylum: Arthropoda
- Clade: Pancrustacea
- Class: Insecta
- Order: Coleoptera
- Suborder: Polyphaga
- Infraorder: Scarabaeiformia
- Family: Scarabaeidae
- Tribe: Melolonthini
- Genus: Hypolepida
- Species: H. braes

Binomial name
- Hypolepida braes Allsopp, 2020

Species of beetle

Hypolepida braes is a species of beetle of the family Scarabaeidae. It is found in Australia (Queensland).

== Description ==
Adults reach a length of about 12 mm (0.47 in). The head, pronotum, scutellum and ventral thorax are black, while the elytra are very dark brown, the antennae are brown and the legs are dark brown to black.

== Etymology ==
The species name is derived from the name of the type locality and is a Lowland Scot word for a hillside.
