= Rhopaea nigricollis =

Scientific classification
- Kingdom: Animalia
- Phylum: Arthropoda
- Clade: Pancrustacea
- Class: Insecta
- Order: Coleoptera
- Suborder: Polyphaga
- Infraorder: Scarabaeiformia
- Family: Scarabaeidae
- Tribe: Melolonthini
- Genus: Rhopaea
- Species: R. nigricollis

Binomial name
- Rhopaea nigricollis Lea, 1919

Species of beetle

Rhopaea nigricollis is a species of beetle of the family Scarabaeidae. It is found in Australia (New South Wales).

== Description ==
Adults reach a length of about 20–23 mm (0.79–0.91 in). The head, pronotum, scutellum and base of the elytra are dark brown, while the rest of the elytra is brown. The antennae, legs and ventral surface are reddish-brown.

== Distribution ==
The official type locality is Beverley, Western Australia, but both Britton (in 1978) and Allsopp (in 2020) expressed doubt about the correctness of this type location, since the species is otherwise known only from New South Wales and no other species of the genus have been recorded from Western Australia.
