= Alepida moorei =

Scientific classification
- Kingdom: Animalia
- Phylum: Arthropoda
- Clade: Pancrustacea
- Class: Insecta
- Order: Coleoptera
- Suborder: Polyphaga
- Infraorder: Scarabaeiformia
- Family: Scarabaeidae
- Tribe: Melolonthini
- Genus: Alepida
- Species: A. moorei

Binomial name
- Alepida moorei Allsopp, 2018

Species of beetle

Alepida moorei is a species of beetle of the family Scarabaeidae. It is found in Australia (Queensland).

== Description ==
Adults reach a length of about 23–25 mm (0.91–0.98 in). They are dark reddish brown, with the pronotum often with darker irregular patches.

== Life history ==
Adults have been recorded in December.

== Etymology ==
The species is named for Barry Philip Moore.
