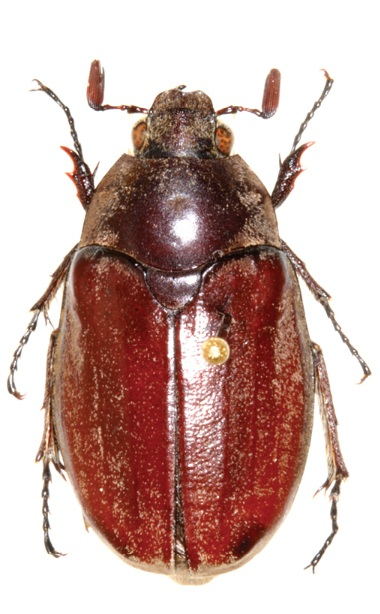

Scientific classification
- Kingdom: Animalia
- Phylum: Arthropoda
- Clade: Pancrustacea
- Class: Insecta
- Order: Coleoptera
- Suborder: Polyphaga
- Infraorder: Scarabaeiformia
- Family: Scarabaeidae
- Tribe: Melolonthini
- Genus: Tocama
- Species: T. laosensis

Binomial name
- Tocama laosensis Li & Keith, 2012

= Tocama laosensis =

Species of beetle

Tocama laosensis is a species of beetle of the family Scarabaeidae. It is found in Laos.

== Description ==
Adults reach a length of about 20 mm (0.79 in). They have a medium sized, thin body, with the pronotum flat when viewed laterally. The head, pronotum and scutellum are blackish brown, while the elytra are dull castaneous. The surface of the pronotum, scutellum and elytra is covered with tiny brownish grey setae, and the setae on the vertex are about four times the length of those on the pronotum and elytra. The basal margin of the elytra between the scutellum and humeral umbone is broadly ridged. The apical ridge of the pygidium is impressed and becomes concave inwardly along the plane of the disc.

== Etymology ==
The species name is derived from the name of Laos, wherefrom it is described.
