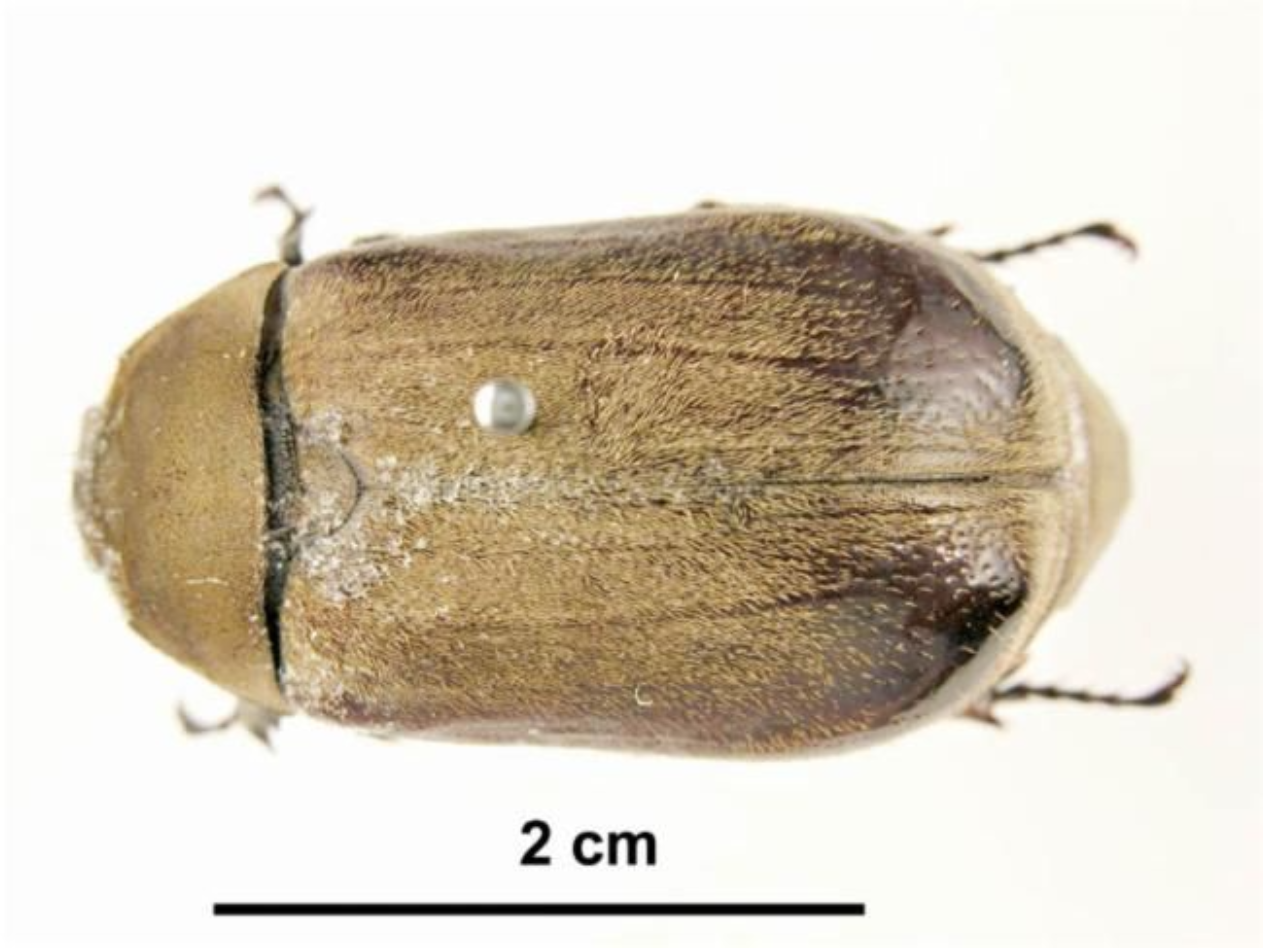

Scientific classification
- Kingdom: Animalia
- Phylum: Arthropoda
- Clade: Pancrustacea
- Class: Insecta
- Order: Coleoptera
- Suborder: Polyphaga
- Infraorder: Scarabaeiformia
- Family: Scarabaeidae
- Tribe: Melolonthini
- Genus: Alepida
- Species: A. froggatti

Binomial name
- Alepida froggatti (MacLeay, 1887)

Synonyms
- Lepidiota froggatti MacLeay, 1887

= Alepida froggatti =

Species of beetle

Alepida froggatti is a species of beetle of the family Scarabaeidae. It is found in Australia (Queensland).

== Description ==
Adults reach a length of about 30–38 mm (1.2–1.5 in). They are black, densely covered with short, yellow setae. The legs are also black.

== Life history ==
Larvae are minor pests of sugarcane. Adults have been recorded from October to early March.
