= Pseudholophylla castaneipennis =

Scientific classification
- Kingdom: Animalia
- Phylum: Arthropoda
- Clade: Pancrustacea
- Class: Insecta
- Order: Coleoptera
- Suborder: Polyphaga
- Infraorder: Scarabaeiformia
- Family: Scarabaeidae
- Tribe: Melolonthini
- Genus: Pseudholophylla
- Species: P. castaneipennis

Binomial name
- Pseudholophylla castaneipennis (MacLeay, 1888)

Synonyms
- Rhopaea castaneipennis MacLeay, 1888

Species of beetle

Pseudholophylla castaneipennis is a species of beetle of the family Scarabaeidae. It is found in Australia (Western Australia).

== Description ==
Adults reach a length of about 16 mm (0.63 in). The body is reddish-brown or dark brown, with white scales.
