= Exolontha tonkinensis =

Scientific classification
- Kingdom: Animalia
- Phylum: Arthropoda
- Clade: Pancrustacea
- Class: Insecta
- Order: Coleoptera
- Suborder: Polyphaga
- Infraorder: Scarabaeiformia
- Family: Scarabaeidae
- Tribe: Melolonthini
- Genus: Exolontha
- Species: E. tonkinensis

Binomial name
- Exolontha tonkinensis Moser, 1913

Species of beetle

Exolontha tonkinensis is a species of beetle of the family Scarabaeidae. It is found in Laos, Myanmar, Thailand and China (Yunnan).

== Description ==
Adults reach a length of about 25 mm (0.98 in). They are very similar to Exolontha umbraculata in shape and colouration, but differs immediately in that eight ribs project from the sutural rib on each elytron. The penultimate rib is greatly shortened, in that it does not reach the middle of the elytron from the posterior margin.
