= Alepida stradbrokensis =

Scientific classification
- Kingdom: Animalia
- Phylum: Arthropoda
- Clade: Pancrustacea
- Class: Insecta
- Order: Coleoptera
- Suborder: Polyphaga
- Infraorder: Scarabaeiformia
- Family: Scarabaeidae
- Tribe: Melolonthini
- Genus: Alepida
- Species: A. stradbrokensis

Binomial name
- Alepida stradbrokensis (Lea, 1919)

Synonyms
- Lepidiota froggatti var. stradbrokensis Lea, 1919

Species of beetle

Alepida stradbrokensis is a species of beetle of the family Scarabaeidae. It is found in Australia (Queensland).

== Description ==
Adults reach a length of about 24–26 mm (0.94–1.02 in). They are dark reddish brown, densely covered with short, greyish setae. The legs are very dark brown.

== Life history ==
Adults have been recorded from August to October.
