= Rhopaea laticollis =

Scientific classification
- Kingdom: Animalia
- Phylum: Arthropoda
- Clade: Pancrustacea
- Class: Insecta
- Order: Coleoptera
- Suborder: Polyphaga
- Infraorder: Scarabaeiformia
- Family: Scarabaeidae
- Tribe: Melolonthini
- Genus: Rhopaea
- Species: R. laticollis

Binomial name
- Rhopaea laticollis Blackburn, 1911

Species of beetle

Rhopaea laticollis is a species of beetle of the family Scarabaeidae. It is found in Australia (northern New South Wales, southern Queensland).

== Description ==
Adults reach a length of about 20–24 mm (0.79–0.94 in). They are brown, with the clypeus and the disc or margins of the pronotum sometimes reddish.
