= Pararhopaea minor =

Scientific classification
- Kingdom: Animalia
- Phylum: Arthropoda
- Clade: Pancrustacea
- Class: Insecta
- Order: Coleoptera
- Suborder: Polyphaga
- Infraorder: Scarabaeiformia
- Family: Scarabaeidae
- Tribe: Melolonthini
- Genus: Pararhopaea
- Species: P. minor

Binomial name
- Pararhopaea minor Britton, 1978

Species of beetle

Pararhopaea minor is a species of beetle of the family Scarabaeidae. It is found in Australia (South Australia).

== Description ==
Adults reach a length of about 15 mm (0.59 in). The body is pale yellowish-brown, with the antennae paler. The clypeus, frons, pronotum and scutellum are covered with long setae and there is a dense brush of long yellow setae at the base of the pronotum.
