= Allothnonius mouldsi =

Scientific classification
- Kingdom: Animalia
- Phylum: Arthropoda
- Clade: Pancrustacea
- Class: Insecta
- Order: Coleoptera
- Suborder: Polyphaga
- Infraorder: Scarabaeiformia
- Family: Scarabaeidae
- Tribe: Melolonthini
- Genus: Allothnonius
- Species: A. mouldsi

Binomial name
- Allothnonius mouldsi Allsopp & Smith, 2022

Species of beetle

Allothnonius mouldsi is a species of beetle of the family Scarabaeidae. It is found in Australia (Northern Territory).

== Description ==
Adults reach a length of about 14.5 mm (0.57 in). The head is black and the pronotum is very dark brown to black. The scutellum is lighter brown and the elytra, pygidium and legs are brown. The antennae are pale yellow-brown.

== Etymology ==
The species is named for Max Moulds, one of the collectors of the species.
