= Rhopaea decipiens =

Scientific classification
- Kingdom: Animalia
- Phylum: Arthropoda
- Clade: Pancrustacea
- Class: Insecta
- Order: Coleoptera
- Suborder: Polyphaga
- Infraorder: Scarabaeiformia
- Family: Scarabaeidae
- Tribe: Melolonthini
- Genus: Rhopaea
- Species: R. decipiens

Binomial name
- Rhopaea decipiens Lea, 1919

Species of beetle

Rhopaea decipiens is a species of beetle of the family Scarabaeidae. It is found in Australia (New South Wales).

== Description ==
Adults reach a length of about 18–24 mm (0.71–0.94 in). They are reddish or yellowish brown. The dorsal surface is covered with long yellowish brown setae mixed with short setae.
