= Amblonoxia carpenteri =

Scientific classification
- Kingdom: Animalia
- Phylum: Arthropoda
- Clade: Pancrustacea
- Class: Insecta
- Order: Coleoptera
- Suborder: Polyphaga
- Infraorder: Scarabaeiformia
- Family: Scarabaeidae
- Tribe: Melolonthini
- Genus: Amblonoxia
- Species: A. carpenteri

Binomial name
- Amblonoxia carpenteri (LeConte, 1876)

Synonyms
- Thyce crinicollis Casey, 1914; Thyce pistoria Casey, 1895

Species of beetle

Amblonoxia carpenteri is a species of scarab beetle in the family Scarabaeidae.
