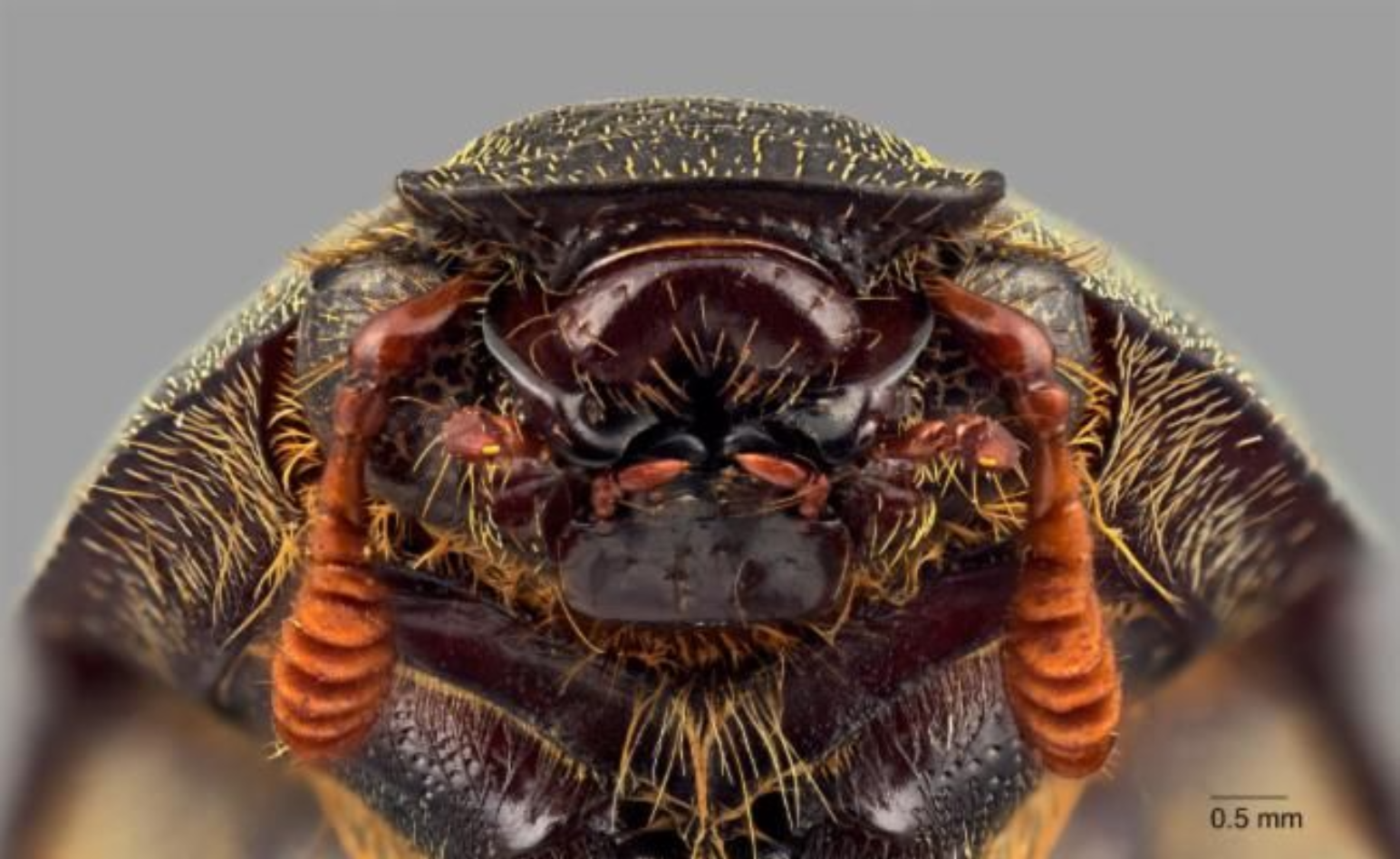

Scientific classification
- Kingdom: Animalia
- Phylum: Arthropoda
- Clade: Pancrustacea
- Class: Insecta
- Order: Coleoptera
- Suborder: Polyphaga
- Infraorder: Scarabaeiformia
- Family: Scarabaeidae
- Tribe: Melolonthini
- Genus: Metatrogus
- Species: M. lukei

Binomial name
- Metatrogus lukei Allsopp, 1999

= Metatrogus lukei =

Species of beetle

Metatrogus lukei is a species of beetle of the family Scarabaeidae. It is found in Australia (Queensland).

== Description ==
Adults reach a length of about 27–28 mm (1.1–1.1 in) for males and 29–30 mm (1.1–1.2 in) for females. The head and pronotum are black with a pruinose bloom, while the elytra are dark brown to black, also with a pruinose bloom. The pygidium is dark brown and the venter and legs are dark brown to black. The antennae are yellowish-brown to dark brown.

== Etymology ==
The species is named after the son of the author, Luke Allsopp, who collected the first two specimens.
