= Carlschoenherria carinata =

Scientific classification
- Kingdom: Animalia
- Phylum: Arthropoda
- Clade: Pancrustacea
- Class: Insecta
- Order: Coleoptera
- Suborder: Polyphaga
- Infraorder: Scarabaeiformia
- Family: Scarabaeidae
- Tribe: Melolonthini
- Genus: Carlschoenherria
- Species: C. carinata

Binomial name
- Carlschoenherria carinata (Moser, 1913)

Synonyms
- Schoenherria carinata Moser, 1913

Species of beetle

Carlschoenherria carinata is a species of beetle of the family Scarabaeidae. It is found in Indonesia (Kalimantan) and Malaysia (Sabah).

== Description ==
Adults reach a length of about 19–22 mm (0.75–0.87 in). They are related to Carlschoenherria hispida, which also occurs on Borneo, but it is smaller and somewhat darker in colour. The head is wrinkled and punctured, with erect yellow hairs. Not only the frons, as in hispida, but also the clypeus is keeled in the middle and the anterior margin of the latter is only weakly, but distinctly, emarginate. The black antennal club is somewhat shorter than the reddish-brown stalk. The pronotum is similar in shape to that of hispida, the punctures are even coarser, and the middle also bears a longitudinal groove. The bristle-like hairs are sometimes arranged in dense groups on the sides. On the elytra, the spaces between the smooth ribs are densely punctured and covered with yellow and white setae, the latter being predominant, unlike in hispida. The chest is covered with yellowish-grey hair, the abdomen is widely punctured in the middle, and each puncture has a yellow or white bristle. On the sides, each abdominal segment bears a patch of densely packed golden-yellow hairs.
