= Rhopaea australis =

Scientific classification
- Kingdom: Animalia
- Phylum: Arthropoda
- Clade: Pancrustacea
- Class: Insecta
- Order: Coleoptera
- Suborder: Polyphaga
- Infraorder: Scarabaeiformia
- Family: Scarabaeidae
- Tribe: Melolonthini
- Genus: Rhopaea
- Species: R. australis

Binomial name
- Rhopaea australis (Blackburn, 1888)

Synonyms
- Holophylla australis Blackburn, 1888

Species of beetle

Rhopaea australis is a species of beetle of the family Scarabaeidae. It is found in Australia (Kangaroo Island, South Australia).

== Description ==
Adults reach a length of about 19 mm (0.75 in). The base of the clypeus, frons, pronotum, scutellum and elytra are dark brown, while the apex of the clypeus and the lateral margins of the pronotum are reddish. The antennae, legs and ventral surface are yellowish or reddish brown and the pygidium is dark brown with a reddish spot at the lateral edges. There are yellowish brown setae on the dorsal surface.
