= Rhizoproctus usambarae =

Scientific classification
- Kingdom: Animalia
- Phylum: Arthropoda
- Clade: Pancrustacea
- Class: Insecta
- Order: Coleoptera
- Suborder: Polyphaga
- Infraorder: Scarabaeiformia
- Family: Scarabaeidae
- Tribe: Melolonthini
- Genus: Rhizoproctus
- Species: R. usambarae

Binomial name
- Rhizoproctus usambarae Brenske, 1903

Species of beetle

Rhizoproctus usambarae is a species of beetle of the family Scarabaeidae. It is found in Tanzania.

== Description ==
Adults reach a length of about 15 mm (0.59 in). They are glossy reddish-brown with dull elytra. The clypeus is short, flatly rounded with broadly rounded corners, concave, and covered with lanceolate white scales. The frons is broad, featuring a smooth raised area in the center and dense scaling. The vertex is roughly punctate with short, erect hairs. The pronotum is short, with acute anterior corners and right-angled posterior corners. The anterior margin, which has a distinct membranous border in the center, is edged with a narrow band of robust scales. This band is somewhat narrower along the lateral margins and almost completely interrupted at the center of the posterior margin. The smooth surface is transversely scattered with scales set in impressed punctures, and the center bears a slightly impressed longitudinal line. The scutellum is almost semicircular, with finer scales along the sides. The elytra are evenly and sparsely covered with fine, scale-like punctures, lacking a distinct sutural ridge or costae. The pygidium is finely scaled. The convex abdomen is densely covered with robust scales across the centers of the segments.
