= Hypolepida wilsoni =

Scientific classification
- Kingdom: Animalia
- Phylum: Arthropoda
- Clade: Pancrustacea
- Class: Insecta
- Order: Coleoptera
- Suborder: Polyphaga
- Infraorder: Scarabaeiformia
- Family: Scarabaeidae
- Tribe: Melolonthini
- Genus: Hypolepida
- Species: H. wilsoni

Binomial name
- Hypolepida wilsoni Britton, 1978

Species of beetle

Hypolepida wilsoni is a species of beetle of the family Scarabaeidae. It is found in Australia (northern Queensland).

== Description ==
Adults reach a length of about 12–16 mm (0.47–0.63 in). The head, pronotum, scutellum and pygidium are black, while the elytra are brown, and the antennae pale yellowish-brown (becoming darker towards the base of the lamellae).
