= Barryfilius vernus =

Scientific classification
- Kingdom: Animalia
- Phylum: Arthropoda
- Clade: Pancrustacea
- Class: Insecta
- Order: Coleoptera
- Suborder: Polyphaga
- Infraorder: Scarabaeiformia
- Family: Scarabaeidae
- Tribe: Melolonthini
- Genus: Barryfilius
- Species: B. vernus

Binomial name
- Barryfilius vernus (Britton, 1978)

Synonyms
- Lepidiota verna Britton, 1978

Species of beetle

Barryfilius vernus is a species of beetle of the family Scarabaeidae. It is found in Australia (Queensland).

== Description ==
Adults reach a length of about 20–22 mm (0.79–0.87 in). They are very dark reddish-brown.

== Life history ==
Adults have mainly been collected from November to January.
