= Exolontha aterrima =

Scientific classification
- Kingdom: Animalia
- Phylum: Arthropoda
- Clade: Pancrustacea
- Class: Insecta
- Order: Coleoptera
- Suborder: Polyphaga
- Infraorder: Scarabaeiformia
- Family: Scarabaeidae
- Tribe: Melolonthini
- Genus: Exolontha
- Species: E. aterrima

Binomial name
- Exolontha aterrima Keith & Sabatinelli, 2012

Species of beetle

Exolontha aterrima is a species of beetle of the family Scarabaeidae. It is found in Thailand.

== Description ==
Adults reach a length of about 18–19 mm (0.71–0.75 in). They have an elongate-oval body. They are entirely black, with very dark brownish to blackish hairs. They are largely greyish underneath.

== Etymology ==
The species name refers to its uniformly black colour.
