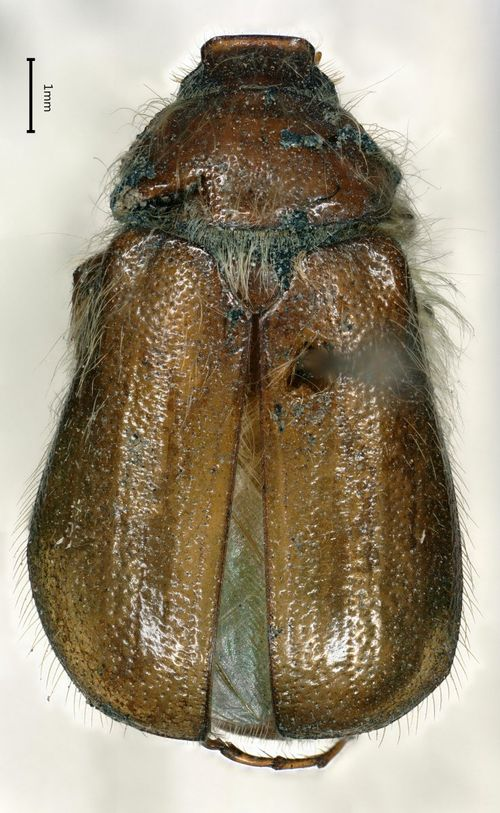

Scientific classification
- Kingdom: Animalia
- Phylum: Arthropoda
- Clade: Pancrustacea
- Class: Insecta
- Order: Coleoptera
- Suborder: Polyphaga
- Infraorder: Scarabaeiformia
- Family: Scarabaeidae
- Tribe: Melolonthini
- Genus: Pseudosymmachia
- Species: P. thibetana

Binomial name
- Pseudosymmachia thibetana (Moser, 1914)

Synonyms
- Metabolus thibetanus Moser, 1914

= Pseudosymmachia thibetana =

Species of beetle

Pseudosymmachia thibetana is a species of beetle of the family Scarabaeidae. It is found in Tibet.

== Description ==
Adults reach a length of about 10–11 mm (0.39–0.43 in). The head is somewhat narrower than most other Pseudosymmachia species, the clypeal suture is strongly curved forward, the clypeus tapers only very slightly towards the anterior margin, the upturned anterior margin is barely perceptible, and the anterior angles are rounded. The head is wrinkled and punctate, more coarsely on the yellow-haired frons than on the clypeus. The pronotum is more than twice as wide as it is long, arched in the middle, with weakly serrated lateral margins and obtuse anterior and posterior angles. The surface is quite extensively covered with strong, long-haired punctures, and the posterior margin is also fringed with long cilia. The scutellum is sparsely punctate. The elytra are sparsely pubescent behind the base, weakly wrinkled, and moderately densely but rather strongly punctate. Apart from the convex suture, each elytron has three smooth ridges, the first of which widens posteriorly next to the suture. The pygidium bears widely spaced, pubescent punctures in addition to extremely fine and dense punctation. The thorax is densely covered with yellow pubescence and the abdomen is very sparsely punctate in the middle, becoming somewhat more closely punctate laterally, with pubescent punctures.
