= Barryfilius centralis =

Scientific classification
- Kingdom: Animalia
- Phylum: Arthropoda
- Clade: Pancrustacea
- Class: Insecta
- Order: Coleoptera
- Suborder: Polyphaga
- Infraorder: Scarabaeiformia
- Family: Scarabaeidae
- Tribe: Melolonthini
- Genus: Barryfilius
- Species: B. centralis

Binomial name
- Barryfilius centralis (Britton, 1978)

Synonyms
- Lepidiota centralis Britton, 1978

Species of beetle

Barryfilius centralis is a species of beetle of the family Scarabaeidae. It is found in Australia (with the type locality given as the Barkley Tableland in the Northern Territory).

== Description ==
Adults reach a length of about 17 mm (0.67 in). They are bright reddish-brown, with the antennal lamellae pale yellowish-brown.

== Taxonomy and distribution ==
In his 2022 paper, Allsopp transferred centralis from Lepidiota to the newly erected genus Barryfilius. He also expressed doubt about the type locality, which is very far from the areas where the other species of the genus occur. He suspects the holotype specimen was mislabeled and argues the specimen was probably collected at either Mount Elliot or Mount Abbott in Queensland.
