= Rhizoproctus exhaustus =

Scientific classification
- Kingdom: Animalia
- Phylum: Arthropoda
- Clade: Pancrustacea
- Class: Insecta
- Order: Coleoptera
- Suborder: Polyphaga
- Infraorder: Scarabaeiformia
- Family: Scarabaeidae
- Tribe: Melolonthini
- Genus: Rhizoproctus
- Species: R. exhaustus

Binomial name
- Rhizoproctus exhaustus Kolbe, 1914

Species of beetle

Rhizoproctus exhaustus is a species of beetle of the family Scarabaeidae. It is found in the Democratic Republic of the Congo and Rwanda.

== Description ==
Adults reach a length of about 19 mm (0.75 in). They are similar to Rhizoproctus aurescens, but the body is wider towards the rear. The head is strongly wrinkled-punctate. The pronotum is very similar, but wider in the middle, more strongly narrowed posteriorly, the anterior angles much longer and more pointed, and with a deep bulge at the lateral margin in front of the anterior angles. The punctation is scattered above, somewhat coarse, leaving smooth areas in the middle and laterally. The scales are smaller than in aurescens. The elytra are somewhat more strongly punctate and the scales, where visible (towards the sides) are very small. The thorax is as densely hairy as in aurescens.
