= Rhopaea hirtuosa =

Scientific classification
- Kingdom: Animalia
- Phylum: Arthropoda
- Clade: Pancrustacea
- Class: Insecta
- Order: Coleoptera
- Suborder: Polyphaga
- Infraorder: Scarabaeiformia
- Family: Scarabaeidae
- Tribe: Melolonthini
- Genus: Rhopaea
- Species: R. hirtuosa

Binomial name
- Rhopaea hirtuosa Blackburn, 1898

Species of beetle

Rhopaea hirtuosa is a species of beetle of the family Scarabaeidae. It is found in Australia (south-eastern New South Wales, eastern Victoria).

== Description ==
Adults reach a length of about 20–23 mm (0.79–0.91 in). They are brown or reddish brown, with the antennae, legs and ventral surface yellowish-brown.
