= Anisopholis clypeata =

Scientific classification
- Kingdom: Animalia
- Phylum: Arthropoda
- Clade: Pancrustacea
- Class: Insecta
- Order: Coleoptera
- Suborder: Polyphaga
- Infraorder: Scarabaeiformia
- Family: Scarabaeidae
- Tribe: Melolonthini
- Genus: Anisopholis
- Species: A. clypeata

Binomial name
- Anisopholis clypeata Moser, 1913

Species of beetle

Anisopholis clypeata is a species of beetle of the family Scarabaeidae. It is found in Indonesia (Sumatra).

== Description ==
Adults reach a length of about 24 mm (0.94 in). In colour and shape, they are similar to Carlschoenherria squamulifera, but they are slightly smaller and easily distinguished by the different formation of the clypeus. The head is moderately densely punctate, the punctures bearing round or egg-shaped scales. The anterior margin of the clypeus is, as in males of squamulifera, upturned. However, while in the latter species it is barely imperceptibly emarginate in the middle, in clypeata it is deeply arched across its entire width. The pronotum is sparsely punctate in the middle, somewhat more densely punctate at the sides. The punctures are very closely spaced in three longitudinal furrows. All punctures are covered with rounded or egg-shaped scales. The lateral margins are weakly punctate-notched, with yellowish setae and hairs in the punctures. The scutellum is smooth. On the elytra, only the medial rib and a second rib next to it are clearly visible. Two further ribs are only indicated. The punctation of the elytra is moderately dense, and each puncture bears a very small scale. Isolated larger scales are broadly ovate.
