= Carlschoenherria gapudi =

Scientific classification
- Kingdom: Animalia
- Phylum: Arthropoda
- Clade: Pancrustacea
- Class: Insecta
- Order: Coleoptera
- Suborder: Polyphaga
- Infraorder: Scarabaeiformia
- Family: Scarabaeidae
- Tribe: Melolonthini
- Genus: Carlschoenherria
- Species: C. gapudi

Binomial name
- Carlschoenherria gapudi Calcetas, 2019

Species of beetle

Carlschoenherria gapudi is a species of beetle of the family Scarabaeidae. It is found in the Philippines (Mindanao).

== Description ==
Adults reach a length of about 21.3 mm (0.84 in). They have a dichromatic body, with the head, pronotum and scutellum blackish brown. The anterior half of the elytra is dark reddish brown with a blackish tinge, while the posterior half has a dark alutaceous tinge and is covered with yellowish white setae.

== Etymology ==
The species is named after Dr. Victor P. Gapud, Professor Emeritus of Taxonomy and Systematics at the Crop Protection Cluster, University of the Philippines Los Baños.
