= Pararhopaea callabonnensis =

Scientific classification
- Kingdom: Animalia
- Phylum: Arthropoda
- Clade: Pancrustacea
- Class: Insecta
- Order: Coleoptera
- Suborder: Polyphaga
- Infraorder: Scarabaeiformia
- Family: Scarabaeidae
- Tribe: Melolonthini
- Genus: Pararhopaea
- Species: P. callabonnensis

Binomial name
- Pararhopaea callabonnensis (Blackburn, 1894)

Synonyms
- Rhopaea callabonnensis Blackburn, 1894

Species of beetle

Pararhopaea callabonnensis is a species of beetle of the family Scarabaeidae. It is found in Australia (South Australia, Northern Territory, New South Wales, Queensland).

== Description ==
Adults reach a length of about 21–26 mm (0.83–1.02 in). The body is yellowish brown, with the antennae paler. The upper surface of the clypeus is deeply concave with coarse punctures and fine, sparse, erect setae.
