= Allothnonius =

Scientific classification
- Kingdom: Animalia
- Phylum: Arthropoda
- Clade: Pancrustacea
- Class: Insecta
- Order: Coleoptera
- Suborder: Polyphaga
- Infraorder: Scarabaeiformia
- Family: Scarabaeidae
- Subfamily: Melolonthinae
- Tribe: Melolonthini
- Genus: Allothnonius; Britton, 1978

Genus of beetles

Allothnonius is a genus of beetles belonging to the family Scarabaeidae.

== Species ==
- Allothnonius barretti Britton, 1978
- Allothnonius brooksi Britton, 1978
- Allothnonius mouldsi Allsopp & Smith, 2022
