= Holorhopaea =

Scientific classification
- Kingdom: Animalia
- Phylum: Arthropoda
- Clade: Pancrustacea
- Class: Insecta
- Order: Coleoptera
- Suborder: Polyphaga
- Infraorder: Scarabaeiformia
- Family: Scarabaeidae
- Subfamily: Melolonthinae
- Tribe: Melolonthini
- Genus: Holorhopaea; Britton, 1978
- Species: H. sagata

Binomial name
- Holorhopaea sagata Britton, 1978

Genus of beetles

Holorhopaea is a genus of beetle of the family Scarabaeidae. It is monotypic, being represented by the single species, Holorhopaea sagata, which is found in Australia (Northern Territory).

== Description ==
Adults reach a length of about 16 mm (0.63 in). The head and pronotum are pale reddish brown, while the elytra, ventral surface and legs are pale yellowish brown.
