= Plectrodes =

Scientific classification
- Kingdom: Animalia
- Phylum: Arthropoda
- Clade: Pancrustacea
- Class: Insecta
- Order: Coleoptera
- Suborder: Polyphaga
- Infraorder: Scarabaeiformia
- Family: Scarabaeidae
- Subfamily: Melolonthinae
- Tribe: Melolonthini
- Genus: Plectrodes; Horn, 1867
- Species: P. pubescens

Binomial name
- Plectrodes pubescens Horn, 1867

Genus of beetles

Plectrodes is a genus of May beetles and junebugs in the family Scarabaeidae. There is one described species, P. pubescens.
