= Rhopaea =

Scientific classification
- Kingdom: Animalia
- Phylum: Arthropoda
- Clade: Pancrustacea
- Class: Insecta
- Order: Coleoptera
- Suborder: Polyphaga
- Infraorder: Scarabaeiformia
- Family: Scarabaeidae
- Subfamily: Melolonthinae
- Tribe: Melolonthini
- Genus: Rhopaea; Erichson, 1847

Synonyms
- Holophylla Blackburn, 1888

Genus of beetles

Rhopaea is a genus of beetles belonging to the family Scarabaeidae.

== Species ==
- Rhopaea assimilis Blackburn, 1911
- Rhopaea australis (Blackburn, 1888)
- Rhopaea decipiens Lea, 1919
- Rhopaea heterodactyla (Germar, 1848)
- Rhopaea hirtuosa Blackburn, 1898
- Rhopaea laticollis Blackburn, 1911
- Rhopaea magnicornis Blackburn, 1888
- Rhopaea nigricollis Lea, 1919
- Rhopaea pilosa Blackburn, 1911
- Rhopaea verreauxii Blanchard, 1851
