= Anisopholis =

Scientific classification
- Kingdom: Animalia
- Phylum: Arthropoda
- Clade: Pancrustacea
- Class: Insecta
- Order: Coleoptera
- Suborder: Polyphaga
- Infraorder: Scarabaeiformia
- Family: Scarabaeidae
- Subfamily: Melolonthinae
- Tribe: Melolonthini
- Genus: Anisopholis; Moser, 1913

Genus of beetles

Anisopholis is a genus of beetles belonging to the family Scarabaeidae.

== Species ==
- Anisopholis affinis Moser, 1914
- Anisopholis clypeata Moser, 1913
