= Allophyllus =

Scientific classification
- Kingdom: Animalia
- Phylum: Arthropoda
- Clade: Pancrustacea
- Class: Insecta
- Order: Coleoptera
- Suborder: Polyphaga
- Infraorder: Scarabaeiformia
- Family: Scarabaeidae
- Subfamily: Melolonthinae
- Tribe: Melolonthini
- Genus: Allophyllus; Fauvel, 1903

Genus of beetles

Allophyllus is a genus of beetles in the family Scarabaeidae.

== Species ==
The following species are recognized in the genus Allophyllus:

- Allophyllus chazeaui Paulian, 1991
- Allophyllus pentaphyllus Heller, 1916
- Allophyllus tetraphyllus Fauvel, 1903
