= Carlschoenherria =

Scientific classification
- Kingdom: Animalia
- Phylum: Arthropoda
- Clade: Pancrustacea
- Class: Insecta
- Order: Coleoptera
- Suborder: Polyphaga
- Infraorder: Scarabaeiformia
- Family: Scarabaeidae
- Subfamily: Melolonthinae
- Tribe: Melolonthini
- Genus: Carlschoenherria; Bezděk, 2016

Synonyms
- Schoenherria Burmeister, 1855

Genus of beetles

Carlschoenherria is a genus of beetles belonging to the family Scarabaeidae.

== Species ==
- Carlschoenherria adoradae Calcetas, 2019
- Carlschoenherria argus (Burmeister, 1855)
- Carlschoenherria borneensis (Brenske, 1894)
- Carlschoenherria brenskei (Nonfried, 1906)
- Carlschoenherria carinata (Moser, 1913)
- Carlschoenherria clypeata (Heller, 1897)
- Carlschoenherria gapudi Calcetas, 2019
- Carlschoenherria hadsallae Calcetas, 2019
- Carlschoenherria hastata (Arrow, 1938)
- Carlschoenherria hispida (Burmeister, 1855)
- Carlschoenherria kaorui (Itoh, 1993)
- Carlschoenherria palawana (Moser, 1915)
- Carlschoenherria philippinica (Brenske, 1894)
- Carlschoenherria squamulifera (Brenske, 1897)
- Carlschoenherria sulcipennis (Laporte, 1840)
- Carlschoenherria vervex (Sharp, 1876)
