= Thyce deserta =

Scientific classification
- Domain: Eukaryota
- Kingdom: Animalia
- Phylum: Arthropoda
- Class: Insecta
- Order: Coleoptera
- Suborder: Polyphaga
- Infraorder: Scarabaeiformia
- Family: Scarabaeidae
- Genus: Thyce
- Species: T. deserta

Binomial name
- Thyce deserta Hardy, 1974

Species of beetle

Thyce deserta is a species of scarab beetle in the family Scarabaeidae.
