= Megarhopaea =

Scientific classification
- Kingdom: Animalia
- Phylum: Arthropoda
- Clade: Pancrustacea
- Class: Insecta
- Order: Coleoptera
- Suborder: Polyphaga
- Infraorder: Scarabaeiformia
- Family: Scarabaeidae
- Subfamily: Melolonthinae
- Tribe: Melolonthini
- Genus: Megarhopaea; Britton, 1978
- Species: M. gigas

Binomial name
- Megarhopaea gigas (Lea, 1916)

Synonyms
- Pararhopaea gigas Lea, 1916; Rhopaea demarzi Frey, 1969

Genus of beetles

Megarhopaea is a genus of beetle of the family Scarabaeidae. It is monotypic, being represented by the single species, Megarhopaea gigas, which is found in Australia (interior of Western Australia, north-western South Australia).

== Description ==
Adults reach a length of about 33–37 mm (1.3–1.5 in). They are bright reddish brown.
