= Pseudosymmachia =

Scientific classification
- Kingdom: Animalia
- Phylum: Arthropoda
- Clade: Pancrustacea
- Class: Insecta
- Order: Coleoptera
- Suborder: Polyphaga
- Infraorder: Scarabaeiformia
- Family: Scarabaeidae
- Subfamily: Melolonthinae
- Tribe: Melolonthini
- Genus: Pseudosymmachia; Dalla Torre, 1913

Synonyms
- Ablotemus Paulsen & Smith, 2003; Symmachia Brenske, 1892; Metabolus Fairmaire, 1887

Genus of leaf beetles

Pseudosymmachia is a genus of beetles belonging to the family Scarabaeidae.

== Species ==
- Pseudosymmachia babai (Kobayashi, 1990)
- Pseudosymmachia brevicollis (Moser, 1915)
- Pseudosymmachia brevispina (Nomura, 1977)
- Pseudosymmachia callosiceps (Frey, 1972)
- Pseudosymmachia clypeata (Zhang, 1992)
- Pseudosymmachia costata (Gu & Zhang, 1995)
- Pseudosymmachia excisa (Frey, 1972)
- Pseudosymmachia flavescens (Brenske, 1892)
- Pseudosymmachia formosana (Niijima & Kinoshita, 1927)
- Pseudosymmachia fukiensis (Frey, 1972)
- Pseudosymmachia glabrosa (Zhang, 1992)
- Pseudosymmachia impressifrons (Fairmaire, 1887)
- Pseudosymmachia kaschmirensis (Moser, 1915)
- Pseudosymmachia longiuscula (Zhang, 1992)
- Pseudosymmachia manifestus (Kobayashi, 1988)
- Pseudosymmachia montana (Kobayashi, 1987)
- Pseudosymmachia nitididorsis (Kobayashi, 1995)
- Pseudosymmachia setifrons (Moser, 1915)
- Pseudosymmachia similaris (Zhang, 1992)
- Pseudosymmachia similis (Kobayashi, 1987)
- Pseudosymmachia thibetana (Moser, 1914)
- Pseudosymmachia tuberculifrons (Nomura, 1977)
- Pseudosymmachia tumidifrons (Fairmaire, 1887)
- Pseudosymmachia wulaiensis (Kobayashi, 1988)
- Pseudosymmachia yunnanensis (Gu & Zhang, 1995)
