= Cocherellus =

Scientific classification
- Kingdom: Animalia
- Phylum: Arthropoda
- Clade: Pancrustacea
- Class: Insecta
- Order: Coleoptera
- Suborder: Polyphaga
- Infraorder: Scarabaeiformia
- Family: Scarabaeidae
- Subfamily: Melolonthinae
- Tribe: Melolonthini
- Genus: Cocherellus; Paulian, 1991
- Species: C. azureus

Binomial name
- Cocherellus azureus Paulian, 1991

Genus of beetles

Cocherellus is a genus of beetle of the family Scarabaeidae. It is monotypic, being represented by the single species, Cocherellus azureus, which is found in New Caledonia.

== Description ==
Adults reach a length of about 19 mm (0.75 in). They have a shiny black body with red antennae.
