= Sphodroxia =

Scientific classification
- Kingdom: Animalia
- Phylum: Arthropoda
- Clade: Pancrustacea
- Class: Insecta
- Order: Coleoptera
- Suborder: Polyphaga
- Infraorder: Scarabaeiformia
- Family: Scarabaeidae
- Subfamily: Melolonthinae
- Tribe: Melolonthini
- Genus: Sphodroxia; Kraatz, 1890

Genus of leaf beetles

Sphodroxia is a genus of beetles belonging to the family Scarabaeidae.

== Species ==
- Sphodroxia algirica Ley, 1914
- Sphodroxia atripennis Pic, 1918
- Sphodroxia maroccana Ley, 1923
- Sphodroxia mauritanica (Lucas, 1846)
- Sphodroxia quedenfeldti (Brenske, 1889)
