= Exolontha =

Scientific classification
- Kingdom: Animalia
- Phylum: Arthropoda
- Clade: Pancrustacea
- Class: Insecta
- Order: Coleoptera
- Suborder: Polyphaga
- Infraorder: Scarabaeiformia
- Family: Scarabaeidae
- Subfamily: Melolonthinae
- Tribe: Melolonthini
- Genus: Exolontha; Reitter, 1902

Synonyms
- Parexolontha Zhang, 1965

Genus of leaf beetles

Exolontha is a genus of beetles belonging to the family Scarabaeidae.

== Species ==
- Exolontha aterrima Keith & Sabatinelli, 2012
- Exolontha bhutanensis (Frey, 1975)
- Exolontha castanea Zhang, 1965
- Exolontha chiangmaiensis Keith & Sabatinelli, 2012
- Exolontha laticauda (Bates, 1891)
- Exolontha mandarina (Sharp, 1876)
- Exolontha neofuliginosa Ahrens, 2019
- Exolontha obscura (Zhang, 1980)
- Exolontha omeia Zhang, 1965
- Exolontha pennata (Sharp, 1876)
- Exolontha permirabilis Keith, Pham & Sabatinelli, 2023
- Exolontha rangunensis (Brenske, 1899)
- Exolontha ringenbachi Keith, 2008
- Exolontha rugulosa Zhang, 1992
- Exolontha serrulata (Gyllenhal, 1817)
- Exolontha similis Zhang, 1965
- Exolontha tonkinensis Moser, 1913
- Exolontha umbraculata (Burmeister, 1855)
- Exolontha xizangensis (Zhang, 1981)
- Exolontha yaoshana Zhang, 1965
