= Syngeneschiza =

Scientific classification
- Kingdom: Animalia
- Phylum: Arthropoda
- Clade: Pancrustacea
- Class: Insecta
- Order: Coleoptera
- Suborder: Polyphaga
- Infraorder: Scarabaeiformia
- Family: Scarabaeidae
- Subfamily: Melolonthinae
- Tribe: Melolonthini
- Genus: Syngeneschiza; Brenske, 1898

Genus of leaf beetles

Syngeneschiza is a genus of beetles belonging to the family Scarabaeidae.

== Species ==
- Syngeneschiza omrramba Péringuey, 1904
- Syngeneschiza sellata (Klug, 1855)
- Syngeneschiza tarsata Brenske, 1898
