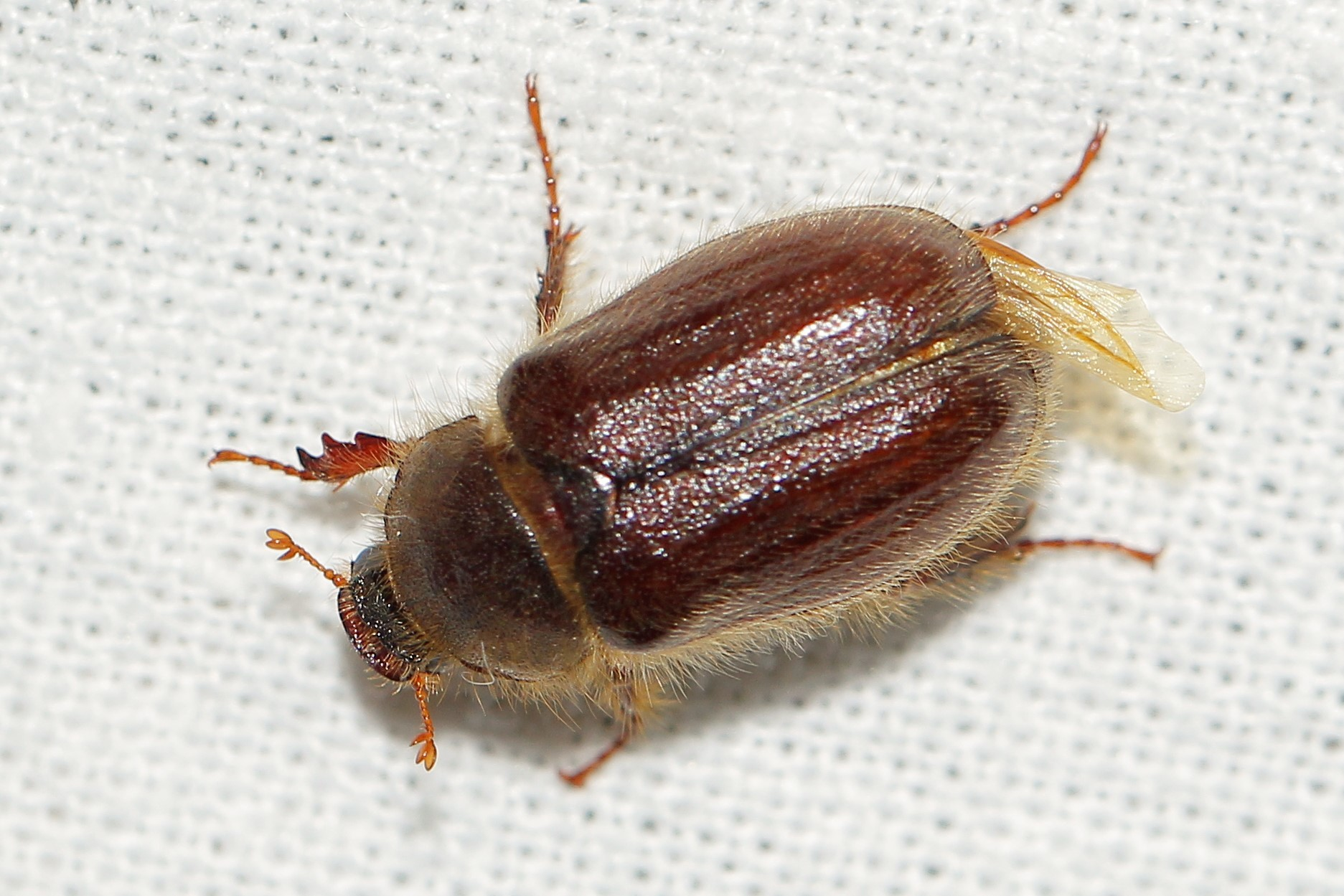
- Lasiopsis canina

Scientific classification
- Kingdom: Animalia
- Phylum: Arthropoda
- Class: Insecta
- Order: Coleoptera
- Suborder: Polyphaga
- Infraorder: Scarabaeiformia
- Superfamily: Scarabaeoidea
- Family: Scarabaeidae
- Subfamily: Melolonthinae
- Tribe: Melolonthini
- Genus: Lasiopsis; Erichson, 1847

= Lasiopsis =

Genus of beetles

Lasiopsis is a Holarctic genus of scarab beetles in the tribe Melolonthini.

== Species ==
- Lasiopsis balgensis Murayama, 1941
- Lasiopsis canina (Zoubkov, 1829)
- Lasiopsis duchoni Reitter, 1902
- Lasiopsis golovjankoi Medvedev, 1951
- Lasiopsis koltzei Reitter, 1900
- Lasiopsis kozlovi Medvedev, 1951
- Lasiopsis kryzhanovskii Nikolajev & Kabakov, 1980
- Lasiopsis manchuricus Murayama, 1941
- Lasiopsis sahlbergi (Mannerheim, 1849)
