= Metatrogus septuosus =

Scientific classification
- Kingdom: Animalia
- Phylum: Arthropoda
- Clade: Pancrustacea
- Class: Insecta
- Order: Coleoptera
- Suborder: Polyphaga
- Infraorder: Scarabaeiformia
- Family: Scarabaeidae
- Tribe: Melolonthini
- Genus: Metatrogus
- Species: M. septuosus

Binomial name
- Metatrogus septuosus Britton, 1978

Species of beetle

Metatrogus septuosus is a species of beetle of the family Scarabaeidae. It is found in Australia (southern Queensland).

== Description ==
Adults reach a length of about 25–30 mm (0.98–1.18 in). The head, pronotum and scutellum are black, while the elytra, abdomen and legs are very dark reddish-brown. The abdominal sternites and pygidium are densely covered with white setae and the dorsal surface has a dull, pruinose bloom.

== Life history ==
Adults have been collected from November to February.
