= Homoeoschiza =

Scientific classification
- Kingdom: Animalia
- Phylum: Arthropoda
- Clade: Pancrustacea
- Class: Insecta
- Order: Coleoptera
- Suborder: Polyphaga
- Infraorder: Scarabaeiformia
- Family: Scarabaeidae
- Subfamily: Melolonthinae
- Tribe: Melolonthini
- Genus: Homoeoschiza; Kolbe, 1894

Genus of beetles

Homoeoschiza is a genus of beetles belonging to the family Scarabaeidae.

== Species ==
- Homoeoschiza aberrans (Gerstaecker, 1873)
- Homoeoschiza flavescens Brenske, 1897
- Homoeoschiza minor Decelle, 1979
