= Zietzia =

Scientific classification
- Kingdom: Animalia
- Phylum: Arthropoda
- Clade: Pancrustacea
- Class: Insecta
- Order: Coleoptera
- Suborder: Polyphaga
- Infraorder: Scarabaeiformia
- Family: Scarabaeidae
- Subfamily: Melolonthinae
- Tribe: Melolonthini
- Genus: Zietzia; Blackburn, 1894
- Species: Z. geologa

Binomial name
- Zietzia geologa Blackburn, 1894

Genus of beetles

Zietzia is a genus of beetle of the family Scarabaeidae. It is monotypic, being represented by the single species, Zietzia geologa, which is found in Australia (South Australia, Northern Territory, Queensland).

== Description ==
Adults reach a length of about 16 mm (0.63 in). They are testaceous, with the margins of the clypeus and the surface of the head near the eyes dark brown. The elytra are sometimes brown with a testaceous base.
