= Hypothyce =

Scientific classification
- Kingdom: Animalia
- Phylum: Arthropoda
- Clade: Pancrustacea
- Class: Insecta
- Order: Coleoptera
- Suborder: Polyphaga
- Infraorder: Scarabaeiformia
- Family: Scarabaeidae
- Tribe: Melolonthini
- Genus: Hypothyce; Howden, 1968

Genus of beetles

Hypothyce is a genus of May beetles and junebugs in the family Scarabaeidae. There are at least three described species in Hypothyce.

== Species ==
These species belong to the genus Hypothyce (as of mid. 2024):

- Hypothyce burnei Skelley, 2005
- Hypothyce mixta Howden, 1968
- Hypothyce osburni (Cartwright, 1967)
- Hypothyce rayi MacGown & Hill, 2023
