= Hypolepida =

Scientific classification
- Kingdom: Animalia
- Phylum: Arthropoda
- Clade: Pancrustacea
- Class: Insecta
- Order: Coleoptera
- Suborder: Polyphaga
- Infraorder: Scarabaeiformia
- Family: Scarabaeidae
- Subfamily: Melolonthinae
- Tribe: Melolonthini
- Genus: Hypolepida; Britton, 1978

Genus of beetles

Hypolepida is a genus of beetles belonging to the family Scarabaeidae.

== Species ==
- Hypolepida braes Allsopp, 2020
- Hypolepida wilsoni Britton, 1978
