= Sebakue =

Scientific classification
- Kingdom: Animalia
- Phylum: Arthropoda
- Clade: Pancrustacea
- Class: Insecta
- Order: Coleoptera
- Suborder: Polyphaga
- Infraorder: Scarabaeiformia
- Family: Scarabaeidae
- Subfamily: Melolonthinae
- Tribe: Melolonthini
- Genus: Sebakue; Péringuey, 1904

Genus of leaf beetles

Sebakue is a genus of beetles belonging to the family Scarabaeidae.

== Species ==
- Sebakue castanea (Moser, 1921)
- Sebakue congoensis (Decelle, 1960)
- Sebakue coriacea (Péringuey, 1904)
- Sebakue ituriensis (Decelle, 1960)
- Sebakue lachnosternoides (Burgeon, 1946)
- Sebakue pallida (Burgeon, 1946)
- Sebakue richardi (Burgeon, 1946)
