= Phiara (beetle) =

Scientific classification
- Kingdom: Animalia
- Phylum: Arthropoda
- Clade: Pancrustacea
- Class: Insecta
- Order: Coleoptera
- Suborder: Polyphaga
- Infraorder: Scarabaeiformia
- Family: Scarabaeidae
- Subfamily: Melolonthinae
- Tribe: Melolonthini
- Genus: Phiara; Brenske, 1897

Genus of beetles

Phiara is a genus of beetles belonging to the family Scarabaeidae.

== Species ==
- Phiara flava Brenske, 1897
- Phiara pseudoaberrans (Gridelli, 1939)
