= Euryschiza =

Scientific classification
- Kingdom: Animalia
- Phylum: Arthropoda
- Clade: Pancrustacea
- Class: Insecta
- Order: Coleoptera
- Suborder: Polyphaga
- Infraorder: Scarabaeiformia
- Family: Scarabaeidae
- Subfamily: Melolonthinae
- Tribe: Melolonthini
- Genus: Euryschiza; Brenske, 1898
- Species: E. salaama

Binomial name
- Euryschiza salaama Brenske, 1898

Genus of beetles

Euryschiza is a genus of beetle of the family Scarabaeidae. It is monotypic, being represented by the single species, Euryschiza salaama, which is found in Tanzania.

== Description ==
Adults reach a length of about 15 mm (0.59 in). They have a narrow, glossy yellowish-brown body. The anterior margin of the pronotum is wavy, slightly protruding in the middle, then slightly indented, the blunt anterior angles extending into the lateral ridge of the anterior margin without projecting. It is sparsely punctate. The elytra are somewhat more densely, but not coarsely, punctate. The pygidium is rounded.
