= Pararhopaea =

Scientific classification
- Kingdom: Animalia
- Phylum: Arthropoda
- Clade: Pancrustacea
- Class: Insecta
- Order: Coleoptera
- Suborder: Polyphaga
- Infraorder: Scarabaeiformia
- Family: Scarabaeidae
- Subfamily: Melolonthinae
- Tribe: Melolonthini
- Genus: Pararhopaea; Blackburn, 1911

Genus of beetles

Pararhopaea is a genus of beetles belonging to the family Scarabaeidae.

== Species ==
- Pararhopaea callabonnensis (Blackburn, 1894)
- Pararhopaea minor Britton, 1978
- Pararhopaea moffatensis Allsopp, 1990
- Pararhopaea rhipidocera Lea, 1916
