= Spathoschiza =

Scientific classification
- Kingdom: Animalia
- Phylum: Arthropoda
- Clade: Pancrustacea
- Class: Insecta
- Order: Coleoptera
- Suborder: Polyphaga
- Infraorder: Scarabaeiformia
- Family: Scarabaeidae
- Subfamily: Melolonthinae
- Tribe: Melolonthini
- Genus: Spathoschiza; Arrow, 1902
- Species: S. debilis

Binomial name
- Spathoschiza debilis Arrow, 1902

Genus of beetles

Spathoschiza is a genus of beetle of the family Scarabaeidae. It is monotypic, being represented by the single species, Spathoschiza debilis, which is found in Zimbabwe.

== Description ==
Adults reach a length of about 9 mm (0.35 in). They are pale testaceous, with the head somewhat reddish and the antennal club flavescent. They are briefly but not densely pilose, with the hairs flavescent and somewhat longer on the under side. The pronotum is finely crenulate and the posterior angles are sharp. It is closely and somewhat deeply punctate, all the punctures bearing a short, setulose hair. The elytra are cylindrical, very little wider at the base than the base of the pronotum and covered with deep, equi-distant, setigerous punctures, separated by an interval about equal in width to their own diameter. The pygidium is deeply and somewhat closely punctate and fringed with long hairs. The underside is deeply and somewhat closely punctured all over.
