= Thyce squamicollis =

Scientific classification
- Kingdom: Animalia
- Phylum: Arthropoda
- Class: Insecta
- Order: Coleoptera
- Suborder: Polyphaga
- Infraorder: Scarabaeiformia
- Family: Scarabaeidae
- Genus: Thyce
- Species: T. squamicollis

Binomial name
- Thyce squamicollis LeConte, 1856

Species of beetle

Thyce squamicollis is a species of scarab beetle in the family Scarabaeidae.
