= Hypotrichia (beetle) =

Scientific classification
- Kingdom: Animalia
- Phylum: Arthropoda
- Clade: Pancrustacea
- Class: Insecta
- Order: Coleoptera
- Suborder: Polyphaga
- Infraorder: Scarabaeiformia
- Family: Scarabaeidae
- Subfamily: Melolonthinae
- Tribe: Melolonthini
- Genus: Hypotrichia; LeConte, 1861
- Species: H. spissipes

Binomial name
- Hypotrichia spissipes LeConte, 1861

Genus of beetles

Hypotrichia is a genus of May beetles and junebugs in the family Scarabaeidae. It is monotypic, being represented by the single species, Hypotrichia spissipes, which is endemic to the upland sand ridges of peninsular Florida.

== Description ==
Adults reach a length of about 12.4–16 mm (0.49–0.63 in). They may be distinguished from all other Melolonthinae species in the United States by the uniquely lobed tarsal claws and lack of scale-like hairs.

== Life history ==
Adult males only fly in the rain. Adult females have fully developed wings, but they are thought to rarely or never fly.
