= Pseudholophylla =

Scientific classification
- Kingdom: Animalia
- Phylum: Arthropoda
- Clade: Pancrustacea
- Class: Insecta
- Order: Coleoptera
- Suborder: Polyphaga
- Infraorder: Scarabaeiformia
- Family: Scarabaeidae
- Subfamily: Melolonthinae
- Tribe: Melolonthini
- Genus: Pseudholophylla; Blackburn, 1911

Synonyms
- Paralepidiota Blackburn, 1911; Holophylla Burmeister, 1855

Genus of beetles

Pseudholophylla is a genus of beetles belonging to the family Scarabaeidae.

== Species ==
- Pseudholophylla castaneipennis (MacLeay, 1888)
- Pseudholophylla cavifrons (Lea, 1919)
- Pseudholophylla furfuracea (Burmeister, 1855)
- Pseudholophylla hurai Hutchinson & Allsopp, 2021
- Pseudholophylla lepidoptera (Blackburn, 1912)
- Pseudholophylla soror Britton, 1978
