= Fossocarus =

Scientific classification
- Kingdom: Animalia
- Phylum: Arthropoda
- Clade: Pancrustacea
- Class: Insecta
- Order: Coleoptera
- Suborder: Polyphaga
- Infraorder: Scarabaeiformia
- Family: Scarabaeidae
- Tribe: Melolonthini
- Genus: Fossocarus; Howden, 1961

Genus of beetles

Fossocarus is a genus of May beetles and junebugs in the family Scarabaeidae. There is one described species in Fossocarus, F. creoleorum.
