= Amblonoxia =

Scientific classification
- Kingdom: Animalia
- Phylum: Arthropoda
- Clade: Pancrustacea
- Class: Insecta
- Order: Coleoptera
- Suborder: Polyphaga
- Infraorder: Scarabaeiformia
- Family: Scarabaeidae
- Tribe: Melolonthini
- Genus: Amblonoxia; Reitter, 1902

Synonyms
- Parathyce Hardy, 1974

Genus of beetles

Amblonoxia is a genus of dusty June beetles in the family Scarabaeidae. There are six described species in Amblonoxia.

== Species ==
- Amblonoxia bidentata (Fall, 1932)
- Amblonoxia carpenteri (LeConte, 1876)
- Amblonoxia fieldi (Fall, 1908)
- Amblonoxia harfordi (Casey, 1889)
- Amblonoxia palpalis (Horn, 1880)
- Amblonoxia riversi (Casey, 1895)
