= Alepida =

Scientific classification
- Kingdom: Animalia
- Phylum: Arthropoda
- Clade: Pancrustacea
- Class: Insecta
- Order: Coleoptera
- Suborder: Polyphaga
- Infraorder: Scarabaeiformia
- Family: Scarabaeidae
- Subfamily: Melolonthinae
- Tribe: Melolonthini
- Genus: Alepida; Allsopp, 2018

Genus of beetles

Alepida is a genus of beetles belonging to the family Scarabaeidae.

== Species ==
- Alepida crinita (Brenske, 1900)
- Alepida froggatti (MacLeay, 1887)
- Alepida helleri (Moser, 1913)
- Alepida hylaea (Britton, 1978)
- Alepida moorei Allsopp, 2018
- Alepida picticollis (Lea, 1916)
- Alepida stradbrokensis (Lea, 1919)
- Alepida ultima (Britton, 1978)
