= Beriqua =

Scientific classification
- Kingdom: Animalia
- Phylum: Arthropoda
- Clade: Pancrustacea
- Class: Insecta
- Order: Coleoptera
- Suborder: Polyphaga
- Infraorder: Scarabaeiformia
- Family: Scarabaeidae
- Subfamily: Melolonthinae
- Tribe: Melolonthini
- Genus: Beriqua; Péringuey, 1904
- Species: B. modesta

Binomial name
- Beriqua modesta Péringuey, 1904

Genus of beetles

Beriqua is a genus of beetle of the family Scarabaeidae. It is monotypic, being represented by the single species, Beriqua modesta, which is found in South Africa (Northern Cape).

== Description ==
Adults reach a length of about 13 mm (0.51 in). They are chestnut-red and moderately shining, with head and pronotum clothed with long, light fulvous hairs, not sufficiently dense, however, to hide the teguments. The clypeus is glabrous and deeply but sparingly punctured in the anterior part and impunctate in the centre. The pronotum is covered all over with equi-distant, deep, round punctures, and has a smooth raised median line in the posterior part of the disk. The elytra are without any costule or stria, not even a juxta-sutural one, and covered with deep, round punctures, each bearing a minute greyish hair.
