= Xenotrogus =

Scientific classification
- Kingdom: Animalia
- Phylum: Arthropoda
- Clade: Pancrustacea
- Class: Insecta
- Order: Coleoptera
- Suborder: Polyphaga
- Infraorder: Scarabaeiformia
- Family: Scarabaeidae
- Subfamily: Melolonthinae
- Tribe: Melolonthini
- Genus: Xenotrogus; Britton, 1978

Genus of leaf beetles

Xenotrogus is a genus of beetles belonging to the family Scarabaeidae.

== Species ==
- Xenotrogus bisquamulata (Moser, 1919)
- Xenotrogus salomoensis (Moser, 1919)
- Xenotrogus subnitida (Arrow, 1915)
- Xenotrogus vestita (Arrow, 1915)
- Xenotrogus vitiensis (Fairmaire, 1881)
