= Suntemnonycha =

Scientific classification
- Kingdom: Animalia
- Phylum: Arthropoda
- Clade: Pancrustacea
- Class: Insecta
- Order: Coleoptera
- Suborder: Polyphaga
- Infraorder: Scarabaeiformia
- Family: Scarabaeidae
- Subfamily: Melolonthinae
- Tribe: Melolonthini
- Genus: Suntemnonycha; Péringuey, 1904
- Species: S. collusor

Binomial name
- Suntemnonycha collusor Péringuey, 1904

Genus of beetles

Suntemnonycha is a genus of beetle of the family Scarabaeidae. It is monotypic, being represented by the single species, Suntemnonycha collusor, which is found in Zimbabwe.

== Description ==
Adults reach a length of about 13.5 mm (0.53 in). They are ferruginous, a little lighter on the elytra. The antennal club of the males is light chestnut-brown. The pronotum and elytra have the same shape as in Schizonycha species. The former is densely pubescent along the frontal and outer margins, and also along the median part of the base above the scutellum. The punctures are not scrobiculate laterally, and are divided from each other on the disk by a space equal to their own diameter, but they are more closely set along the anterior margin. The scutellum is hairy, and the punctures on the elytra are deep with the smooth, slightly raised intervals, narrower in the anterior than in the posterior part. The pygidium is closely punctate, with the punctures squamigerous.
