= Tocama =

Scientific classification
- Kingdom: Animalia
- Phylum: Arthropoda
- Clade: Pancrustacea
- Class: Insecta
- Order: Coleoptera
- Suborder: Polyphaga
- Infraorder: Scarabaeiformia
- Family: Scarabaeidae
- Subfamily: Melolonthinae
- Tribe: Melolonthini
- Genus: Tocama; Reitter, 1902

Synonyms
- Zhangia Bunalski, 2002

Genus of leaf beetles

Tocama is a genus of beetles belonging to the family Scarabaeidae.

== Species ==
- Tocama formosana (Yu, Kobayashi & Chu, 1998)
- Tocama hebeica Keith & Sabatinelli, 2012
- Tocama huangjianbini Wang, 2022
- Tocama laevipennis (Blanchard, 1851)
- Tocama laosensis Li & Keith, 2012
- Tocama procera Li & Keith, 2012
- Tocama rubiginosa (Fairmaire, 1889)
- Tocama saltini Reichenbach & Hillert, 2025
- Tocama siamensis Keith, 2006
- Tocama similis Li & Wang, 2015
- Tocama tonkinensis (Moser, 1913)
- Tocama varimaculata Li & Yang, 2015
- Tocama zhangia Wang & Li, 2015
