= Conebius =

Scientific classification
- Kingdom: Animalia
- Phylum: Arthropoda
- Clade: Pancrustacea
- Class: Insecta
- Order: Coleoptera
- Suborder: Polyphaga
- Infraorder: Scarabaeiformia
- Family: Scarabaeidae
- Subfamily: Melolonthinae
- Tribe: Melolonthini
- Genus: Conebius; Fauvel, 1903
- Species: C. carinipennis

Binomial name
- Conebius carinipennis Fauvel, 1903

Genus of beetles

Conebius is a genus of beetle of the family Scarabaeidae. It is monotypic, being represented by the single species, Conebius carinipennis, which is found in New Caledonia.

== Description ==
Adults reach a length of about 15 mm (0.59 in). They have a short, broad, shiny, reddish-brown body. The forehead, four spots on the pronotum and the pygidium are black.
