= Pentelia =

Scientific classification
- Kingdom: Animalia
- Phylum: Arthropoda
- Clade: Pancrustacea
- Class: Insecta
- Order: Coleoptera
- Suborder: Polyphaga
- Infraorder: Scarabaeiformia
- Family: Scarabaeidae
- Subfamily: Melolonthinae
- Tribe: Melolonthini
- Genus: Pentelia; Brenske, 1891

Synonyms
- Neopentelia Matsumoto, 2005

Genus of leaf beetles

Pentelia is a genus of beetles belonging to the family Scarabaeidae.

== Species ==
- Pentelia crinifrons Moser, 1912
- Pentelia densa Arrow, 1944
- Pentelia desiderata (Brenske, 1894)
- Pentelia discedens (Sharp, 1881)
- Pentelia impressifrons Matsumoto, 2005
- Pentelia kinabaluensis Brenske, 1896
- Pentelia malaccensis Moser, 1912
- Pentelia serrulata (Brenske, 1894)
