= Thyce =

Scientific classification
- Kingdom: Animalia
- Phylum: Arthropoda
- Clade: Pancrustacea
- Class: Insecta
- Order: Coleoptera
- Suborder: Polyphaga
- Infraorder: Scarabaeiformia
- Family: Scarabaeidae
- Tribe: Melolonthini
- Genus: Thyce; LeConte, 1856

Genus of beetles

Thyce is a genus of May beetles and junebugs in the family Scarabaeidae. There are at least two described species in Thyce.

== Species ==
These two species belong to the genus Thyce:

- Thyce deserta Hardy, 1974
- Thyce squamicollis LeConte, 1856
