= Microrhopaea =

Scientific classification
- Kingdom: Animalia
- Phylum: Arthropoda
- Clade: Pancrustacea
- Class: Insecta
- Order: Coleoptera
- Suborder: Polyphaga
- Infraorder: Scarabaeiformia
- Family: Scarabaeidae
- Subfamily: Melolonthinae
- Tribe: Melolonthini
- Genus: Microrhopaea; Lea, 1920
- Species: M. flavipennis

Binomial name
- Microrhopaea flavipennis Lea, 1920

Genus of beetles

Microrhopaea is a genus of beetle of the family Scarabaeidae. It is monotypic, being represented by the single species, Microrhopaea flavipennis, which is found in Australia (Northern Territory).

== Description ==
Adults reach a length of about 7 mm (0.28 in). The head, pronotum, scutellum and ventral surface are dark brown or black, while the antennae are pale yellowish (except the apex of the scape which is dark brown). The setae and scales are white.
