= Nanorhopaea =

Scientific classification
- Kingdom: Animalia
- Phylum: Arthropoda
- Clade: Pancrustacea
- Class: Insecta
- Order: Coleoptera
- Suborder: Polyphaga
- Infraorder: Scarabaeiformia
- Family: Scarabaeidae
- Subfamily: Melolonthinae
- Tribe: Melolonthini
- Genus: Nanorhopaea; Britton, 1978
- Species: N. testacaea

Binomial name
- Nanorhopaea testacaea Britton, 1978

Genus of beetles

Nanorhopaea is a genus of beetle of the family Scarabaeidae. It is monotypic, being represented by the single species, Nanorhopaea testacaea, which is found in Australia (Western Australia).

== Description ==
Adults reach a length of about 10 mm (0.39 in). The clypeus, frons, pronotum, scutellum and legs are reddish brown, while the elytra, abdomen and antennae are pale testaceous. The punctures on the elytra are reddish brown and the pronotum and pygidium are punctured and setose.
