= Holisonycha =

Scientific classification
- Kingdom: Animalia
- Phylum: Arthropoda
- Clade: Pancrustacea
- Class: Insecta
- Order: Coleoptera
- Suborder: Polyphaga
- Infraorder: Scarabaeiformia
- Family: Scarabaeidae
- Subfamily: Melolonthinae
- Tribe: Melolonthini
- Genus: Holisonycha; Péringuey, 1904
- Species: H. mellila

Binomial name
- Holisonycha mellila Péringuey, 1904

Genus of beetles

Holisonycha is a genus of beetle of the family Scarabaeidae. It is monotypic, being represented by the single species, Holisonycha mellila, which is found in South Africa (Western Cape).

== Description ==
Adults reach a length of about 10–12 mm (0.39–0.47 in). They are light brick-red or pale testaceous and shining. Each puncture on the upper side has a minute hair. The pronotum has the outer margin somewhat crenulate in the posterior part, and is ciliate. The surface is covered with round, scattered punctures separated by smooth intervals, the punctures are more closely set on the sides and along the anterior margin. The scutellum is impunctate and the elytra are elongated and cylindrical, with the punctures somewhat apart. The pygidium is not distinctly punctate.
