= Rhizoproctus =

Scientific classification
- Kingdom: Animalia
- Phylum: Arthropoda
- Clade: Pancrustacea
- Class: Insecta
- Order: Coleoptera
- Suborder: Polyphaga
- Infraorder: Scarabaeiformia
- Family: Scarabaeidae
- Subfamily: Melolonthinae
- Tribe: Melolonthini
- Genus: Rhizoproctus; Kolbe, 1894

Genus of leaf beetles

Rhizoproctus is a genus of beetles belonging to the family Scarabaeidae.

== Species ==
- Rhizoproctus aspersus Arrow, 1943
- Rhizoproctus aurescens Kolbe, 1894
- Rhizoproctus exhaustus Kolbe, 1914
- Rhizoproctus usambarae Brenske, 1903
