= Barryfilius =

Scientific classification
- Kingdom: Animalia
- Phylum: Arthropoda
- Clade: Pancrustacea
- Class: Insecta
- Order: Coleoptera
- Suborder: Polyphaga
- Infraorder: Scarabaeiformia
- Family: Scarabaeidae
- Subfamily: Melolonthinae
- Tribe: Melolonthini
- Genus: Barryfilius; Allsopp, 2022

Genus of beetles

Barryfilius is a genus of beetles belonging to the family Scarabaeidae.

== Species ==
- Barryfilius centralis (Britton, 1978)
- Barryfilius contiguus (Britton, 1978)
- Barryfilius laevis (Arrow, 1932)
- Barryfilius lewisae (Britton, 1978)
- Barryfilius quinarius (Britton, 1978)
- Barryfilius vernus (Britton, 1978)
