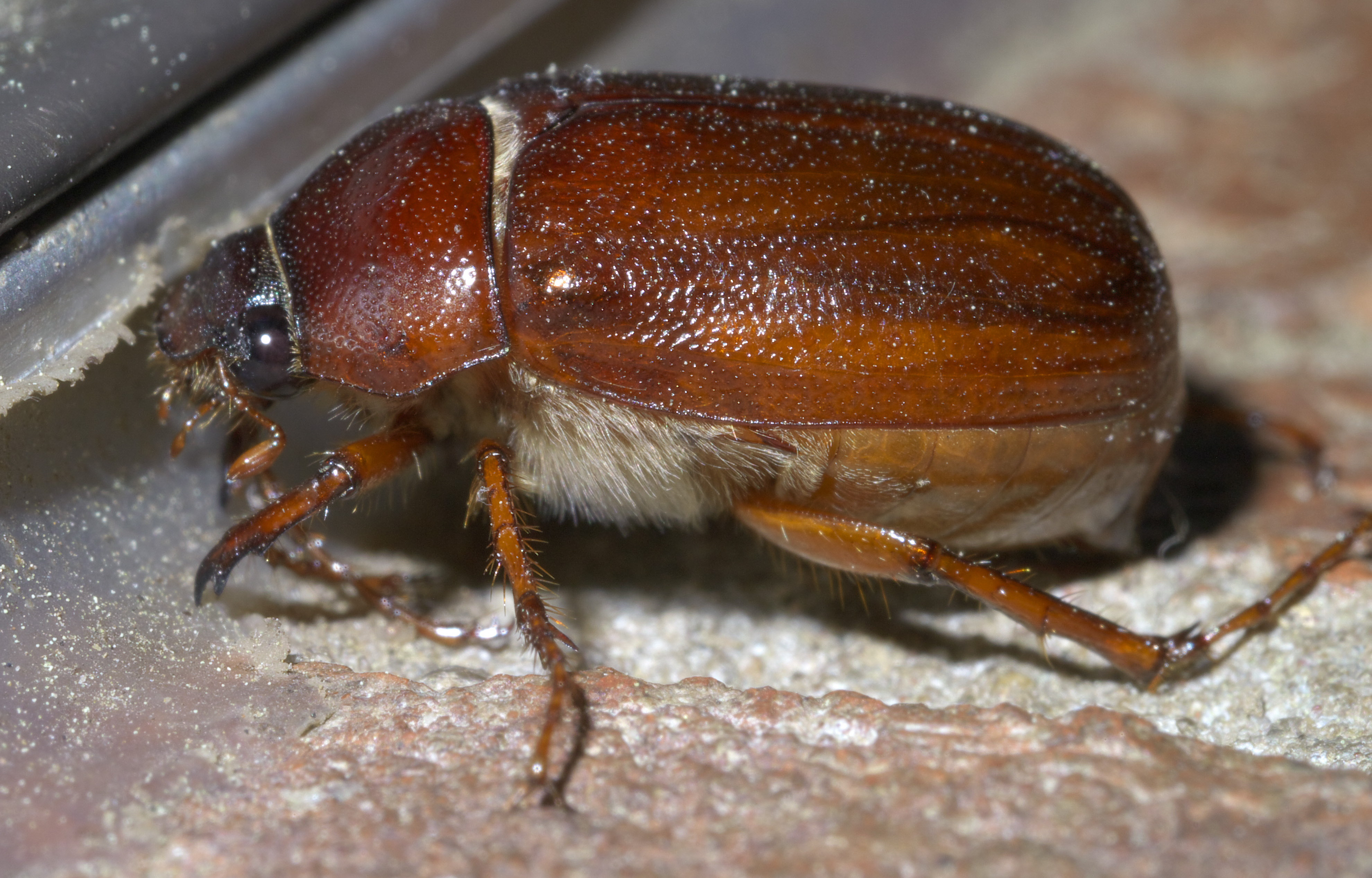
- Phyllophaga sp.

Scientific classification
- Kingdom: Animalia
- Phylum: Arthropoda
- Clade: Pancrustacea
- Class: Insecta
- Order: Coleoptera
- Suborder: Polyphaga
- Infraorder: Scarabaeiformia
- Family: Scarabaeidae
- Subfamily: Melolonthinae
- Tribe: Melolonthini; Leach, 1819

Subtribes
- Enariina Dewailly, 1950 Heptophyllina Medvedev, 1951 Leucopholina Burmeister, 1855 Melolonthina Leach, 1819 Pegylina Lacroix, 1989 Rhizotrogina Burmeister, 1855 Schizonychina Burmeister, 1855

= Melolonthini =

Tribe of beetles

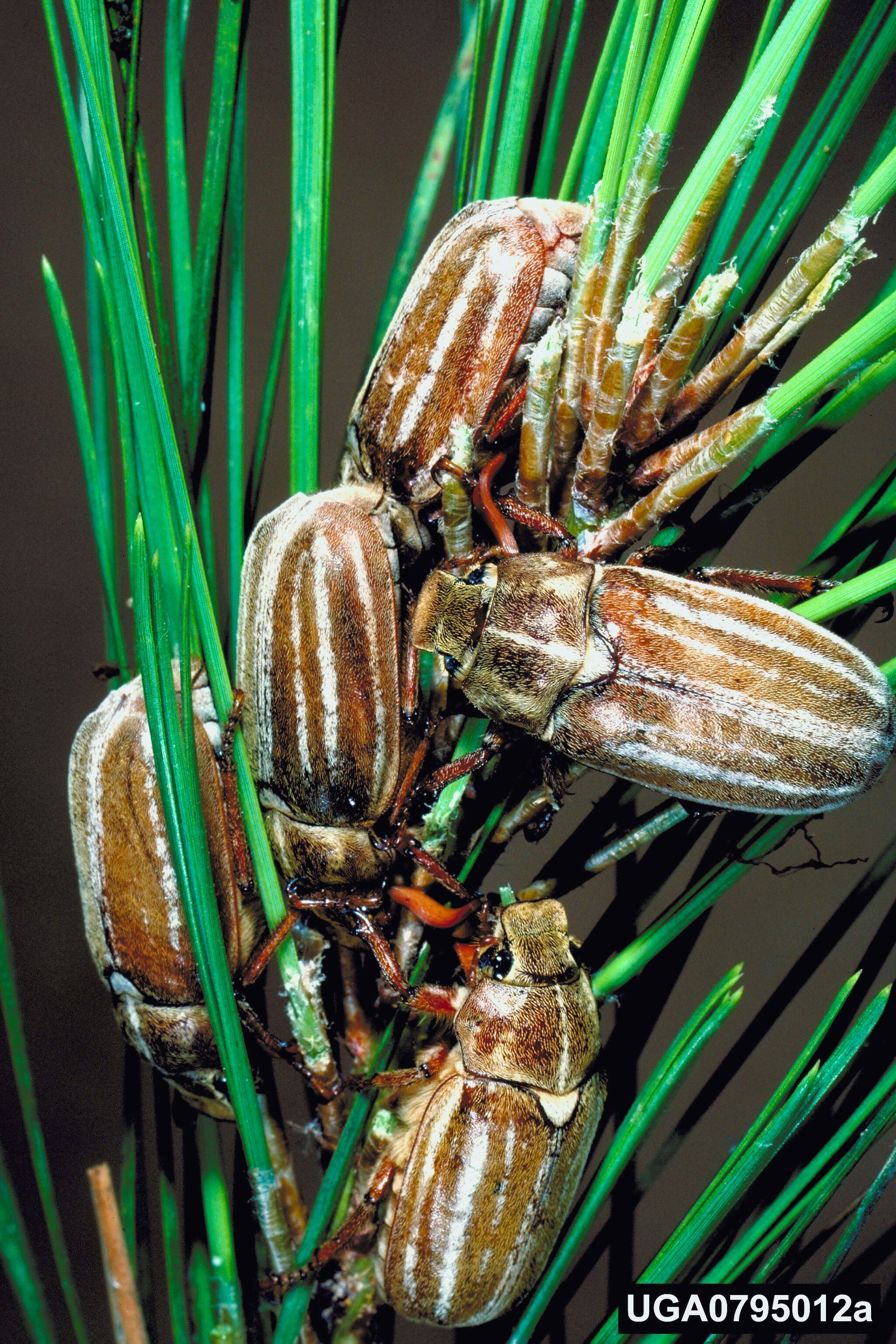
Polyphylla occidentalis

Melolonthini is a tribe of scarab beetles in the family Scarabaeidae. There are over 250 genera in Melolonthini, occurring worldwide; there are over 300 species in North America alone, and more than 3000 worldwide.

== Subtribes and genera ==
The tribe is divided in three subtribes:

- subtribe Enariina Dewailly, 1950
  - Anenaria Lacroix, 1993
  - Anthrencya Lacroix, 1993
  - Apicencya Lacroix, 1993
  - Bisencya Lacroix, 1993
  - Cherbezatina Lacroix, 1993
  - Comencya Lacroix, 1993
  - Djadjoua Lacroix, 1993
  - Djafouna Lacroix, 1993
  - Enaria Erichson, 1847
  - Encya Dejean, 1833
  - Enthora Erichson, 1847
  - Eutrichesis Waterhouse, 1882
  - Globencya Lacroix, 1993
  - Humblotania Lacroix, 1993
  - Joziratia Lacroix, 1993
  - Komrina Lacroix, 1993
  - Lebbea Lacroix, 1993
  - Machala Lacroix, 1993
  - Mayataia Lacroix, 1993
  - Mucrencya Lacroix, 1993
  - Pentaphylla Dewailly, 1950
  - Polyenaria Dewailly, 1950
  - Pseudenaria Fairmaire, 1901
  - Pseudencya Lacroix, 1991
  - Ravautiana Lacroix, 1991
  - Renaudiana Lacroix, 1993
  - Semienaria Dewailly, 1950
  - Synenaria Lacroix, 1993
  - Vadonaria Dewailly, 1950
  - Varencya Lacroix, 1993
- subtribe Melolonthina Leach, 1819
  - Melolontha Fabricius, 1775 (cockchafers)
  - Polyphylla Harris, 1841 (lined June beetles)
  - Psilopholis Brenske, 1892
- subtribe Pegylina Lacroix, 1989
  - Eupegylis Duvivier, 1892
  - Neopegylis Lacroix, 2015
  - Pegylis Erichson, 1847
- Furthermore, the following genera have not been assigned to a subtribe:
  - Achranoxia Kraatz, 1888
  - Adoretops Kraatz, 1883
  - Alepida Allsopp, 2018
  - Allophyllus Fauvel, 1903
  - Allothnonius Britton, 1978
  - Amblonoxia Reitter, 1902 (dusty June beetles)
  - Anisopholis Moser, 1913
  - Anoxia Laporte, 1832
  - Anoxoides Petrovitz, 1971
  - Antitrogus Burmeister, 1855
  - Barryfilius Allsopp, 2022
  - Beriqua Péringuey, 1904
  - Brenskecnemus Allsopp & Schoolmeesters, 2024
  - Carlschoenherria Bezděk, 2016
  - Cephaloschiza Moser, 1920
  - Cheronia Croissandeau, 1893
  - Chiloschiza Moser, 1924
  - Clypeolontha Li & Yang, 1999
  - Cocherellus Paulian, 1991
  - Cochliotodes Burgeon, 1946
  - Conebius Fauvel, 1903
  - Cryptotrogus Kraatz, 1888
  - Cyphonotus Fischer von Waldheim, 1823
  - Dermolepida Arrow, 1941
  - Dinacoma Casey, 1889
  - Engistanoxia Lacroix, 2002
  - Entyposis Kolbe, 1895
  - Euranoxia Semenov, 1890
  - Euryschiza Brenske, 1898
  - Exolontha Reitter, 1902
  - Fossocarus Howden, 1961
  - Globulischiza Frey, 1974
  - Gnaphalostetha Reiche & Saulcy, 1856
  - Gronocarus Schaeffer, 1927
  - Heptelia Brenske, 1898
  - Holisonycha Péringuey, 1904
  - Holomelia Brenske, 1891
  - Holopycnia Brenske, 1896
  - Holorhopaea Britton, 1978
  - Homoeoschiza Kolbe, 1894
  - Hoplosternodes Burgeon, 1946
  - Howdenocarus Hardy, 1978
  - Hypolepida Britton, 1978
  - Hypothyce Howden, 1968
  - Hypotrichia LeConte, 1861
  - Lecanotrogus Kolbe, 1894
  - Megacoryne Britton, 1987
  - Megarhopaea Britton, 1978
  - †Melolonthites Heer, 1847
  - Menigionyx Arrow, 1941
  - Metatrogus Britton, 1978
  - Microphylla Kraatz, 1890
  - Microrhopaea Lea, 1920
  - †Miolachnosterna Wickham, 1914
  - Nanorhopaea Britton, 1978
  - Nematophylla Arrow, 1906
  - Nesadmiralitia Prokofiev, 2016
  - Nuiba Prokofiev, 2016
  - Octoplasia Brenske, 1892
  - Oligophylla Kraatz, 1894
  - Oreotrogus Kolbe, 1897
  - Pararhopaea Blackburn, 1911
  - Pentelia Brenske, 1891
  - Perissosoma Waterhouse, 1875
  - Phiara Brenske, 1897
  - Plectrodes Horn, 1867
  - Polyphyllum Blanchard, 1851
  - Proteroschiza Brenske, 1896
  - Pseudholophylla Blackburn, 1911
  - Pseudosymmachia Dalla Torre, 1913
  - Pseudotocama Keith, 2008
  - Ramilia Kolbe, 1894
  - Rhadinolontha Arrow, 1930
  - Rhizoproctus Kolbe, 1894
  - Rhopaea Erichson, 1847
  - Rhyxicephalus Moser, 1921
  - Rhyxiderma Moser, 1924
  - Schismatocera Gautier Des Cottes, 1872
  - Sebakue Péringuey, 1904
  - Spathoschiza Arrow, 1902
  - Sphodroxia Kraatz, 1890
  - Stenopegylis Arrow, 1943
  - Suntemnonycha Péringuey, 1904
  - Syngeneschiza Brenske, 1898
  - Thyce LeConte, 1856
  - Tocama Reitter, 1902
  - Tricholontha Nomura, 1952
  - Trinoxia Brenske, 1894
  - Xenotrogus Britton, 1978
  - Zietzia Blackburn, 1894

== Formerly placed here ==
- Amphimallon Latreille, 1825 (European chafers)
- Brahmina Blanchard, 1850
- Holotrichia Hope, 1837
- Lasiopsis Erichson, 1847
- Lepidiota Kirby, 1828
- Leucopholis Dejean, 1833
- Megistophylla Burmeister, 1855
- Miridiba Reitter, 1901
- Phyllophaga Harris, 1827 (May beetles)
- Rhizotrogus Lepeletier & Serville, 1825
