= Allochronic speciation =

Speciation arising from change in breeding time

Allochronic speciation (also known as allochronic isolation, or temporal isolation) is a form of speciation (specifically ecological speciation) arising from reproductive isolation that occurs due to a change in breeding time that reduces or eliminates gene flow between two populations of a species. The term allochrony is used to describe the general ecological phenomenon of the differences in phenology that arise between two or more species—speciation caused by allochrony is effectively allochronic speciation.

Environmental changes acting on a species population or populations can drive isolation. An important form of isolation is when populations are separated, not geographically, but temporally (by time). Genetic changes (mutations) over time can cause the two populations to differ—notably in phenology (events in a species life dictated by time such as breeding seasons); exhibiting unique phenotypes (the observable characteristics or traits of an organism).

Scientists have developed models to explain how this process occurs and how it is detected in natural populations. A wealth of studies exist regarding species in allochrony, with a select few that strongly suggest species are speciating or already have speciated as a direct consequence of this mode of isolation.

== Model ==
Breeding seasons of three populations of a species shift over time eventually causing the isolation of their genes from the other populations. This reproductive isolation can lead to speciation.

Speciation ultimately results due to the reproductive isolation between two populations. This can happen in a multitude of ways, a common mode of which is known as allopatric speciation. The geographic mode, where two species become physically isolated and unable to interbreed, allows for selection to act on both populations independently. Over time, this gives rise to a new species. Allochronic speciation is a form of isolation that can involve allopatry; however, it is not required.

Allochrony can involve a number of factors that induce the formation of a new species. Organisms have evolved various reproductive strategies (e.g. semelparity and iteroparity, single or multiple reproductive cycles in a lifetime) that can result in different outcomes for allochrony. Many organisms also breed at different times of the day, different seasons in the year, and even over multiple years or decades. Seasonal breeding in animals is a common occurrence as well as spawning (in aquatic animals) times. In plants, breeding in regards to time could involve the receptivity of the stigma (the female part of the flower) to accepting sperm, periods of pollen release (such as in conifer trees where male cones disperse pollen relying on wind to direct pollen to female cones), or the overall timing of flowering (based on possible environmental cues such as moisture levels, soil type or quality, temperature, or photoperiod). Even migratory patterns can play a role, as species may become isolated due to migrating at different times and to different locations. Climate change is considered to have a significant impact on allochrony—in particular, seasonal breeding species. Modeling changes in species breeding patterns due to climate as well as understanding the genetic mechanisms that control it has proven to be important.

Because of these many factors, slight to major changes in phenology can drive divergence between two populations. For example, a species with multiple breeding seasons in a year may shift those times depending on external conditions such as temperature or predation. In the event the populations (either allopatrically or sympatrically distributed, started breeding at different times, it would prevent members of each population from exchanging genes with one another. Over time, if genes are not exchanged, genetic differences arise in each population. If natural selection acts strongly on the two populations, they may become reproductively isolated, unable to reproduce viable, fertile offspring.

For allochronic speciation to be considered to have actually occurred, the model necessitates three major requirements:

- Phylogenetic analysis must indicate that the two taxa in question are incipient species or clearly sister taxa.
- Breeding timing is required to be genetically-based (heritable) as opposed to changeable throughout life (phenotypic plasticity.
- The source of divergence can be determined to be explicitly allochrony and not the result of reinforcement or other evolutionary mechanisms.

Allochrony is thought to evolve more easily the greater the heritability of reproductive timing—that is, the greater the link between genes and the timing of reproduction—the more likely speciation will occur. Allochrony can be non-genetic; however genetic factors must be involved for isolation to lead to complete reproductive isolation and subsequent speciation. The time frames involving allochrony are typically divided into three categories (prevalence in nature as well as examples are provided alongside each category):

- Daily (considered to be common), examples include stony corals such as Acropora or Orbicella.
- Seasonally (considered to be the most common), seasonal breeding times often coincide with winter, spring, fall, or summer; examples include salmon breeding runs such as in sockeye salmon.
- Yearly (considered rarer), examples include periodical cicadas and bamboo, both of which reproduce within a scale of decades.

=== Population structures ===
A three-dimensional space representing speciation with axes representing the factors involved in the process. The temporal dimension indicates allochrony. The ecological axis correlates with adaptation by time (ABT) whereas the mating axis corresponds to isolation by time (IBT). Breeding time create a fourth dimension expressed as asynchrony in breeding as opposed to synchrony. Speciation events are indicated by the varying colored paths that are taken. A: Absent allochrony, only geographic and mate choice cause isolation. B: Starts with geographic separation, mate choice furthers isolation, and is completed by allochrony. C: Starts with mate-choice differentiation followed by allochrony. D: Mating and ecological factors accompany allochrony.

Other phenotypic traits are often found to co-occur with reproductive timing such as flowering number, egg-clutch sizes, reproductive lifespans, or body size—what can be defined as temporal phenotypic clines. Two explanations exist for the existence of these clines: phenotypic plasticity or phenotypic heritability (or possibly a combination of both). If plastic, the clines arise when certain phenotypic traits influence breeding time—such as reproducing at times when their traits are best suited or if conditions drive the expression of traits. If heritable, the same factors may be expressed as they are in a plastic explanation; however, gene flow limitations allow for adaptation to the specific conditions of the reproductive time. This means that, "an individual with a heritable tendency to reproduce early that instead reproduced late might express traits typical of early reproducers".

Isolation by time (IBT) is partially analogous to the concept of isolation by distance (IBD) wherein genetic differences between populations increase with spatial distance. When IBT is present in a population, the variation of natural selection during a breeding season causes adaptation by time (ABT) generating adaptive temporal variation in phenotypic traits. These two concepts are described in the following sections. Studies of salmonid fishes (involving reproductive lifespans, size at adulthood, age, energy storage, the mass of ovaries, egg sizes, number of eggs in a clutch, fecundity, and rates of development) and flowering plants (involving plant size, duration of flowing time, the number of flowers, the number of fruits, the timing of fruiting, and leaf size) have provided strong evidence of IBT leading to ABT as well as studies of yearly allochrony.

==== Isolation by time ====
The concept of IBT warrants two probabilities: in the event that heritability in reproductive timing exists among populations that breed during different seasons, probability of mating will be, "inversely proportional to the difference in the heritable component of their reproductive times." The probability of mating can also be proportional to breeding values (phenotypic trait expressed as the trait of its offspring) for reproductive time in the event the heritability is additive (more than one gene controls the phenotypic trait). In a population, offspring will inherit the traits for reproductive time causing a decrease in gene flow while reproductive timing differences increase.

==== Adaptation by time ====
Adaptation by time is an extension of divergence due to limited gene flow between populations experiencing different selective pressures. Typically this is limited to spatial variation such as in ecological speciation; however, in allochrony, selection varies not just in space, but in reproductive time—giving rise to adaptive temporal clines in phenotypic traits that are heritable. Isolation by time effectively allows adaptive temporal clines to evolve as long as the reproductive season has selective variation. Evidence for adaptation by time demands four factors: 1) time restricts gene flow, 2) the reproductive season expresses variations in phenotypic traits, 3) temporal variation is controlled genetically (it is not plastic), and 4) temporal variation is adaptive. ABT increases, "as (i) selection on the trait increases; (ii) environmental influences on reproductive time decrease; (iii) the heritability of reproductive time increases; and (iv) the temporal distribution of reproductive activity becomes increasingly uniform."

== Detecting allochrony ==
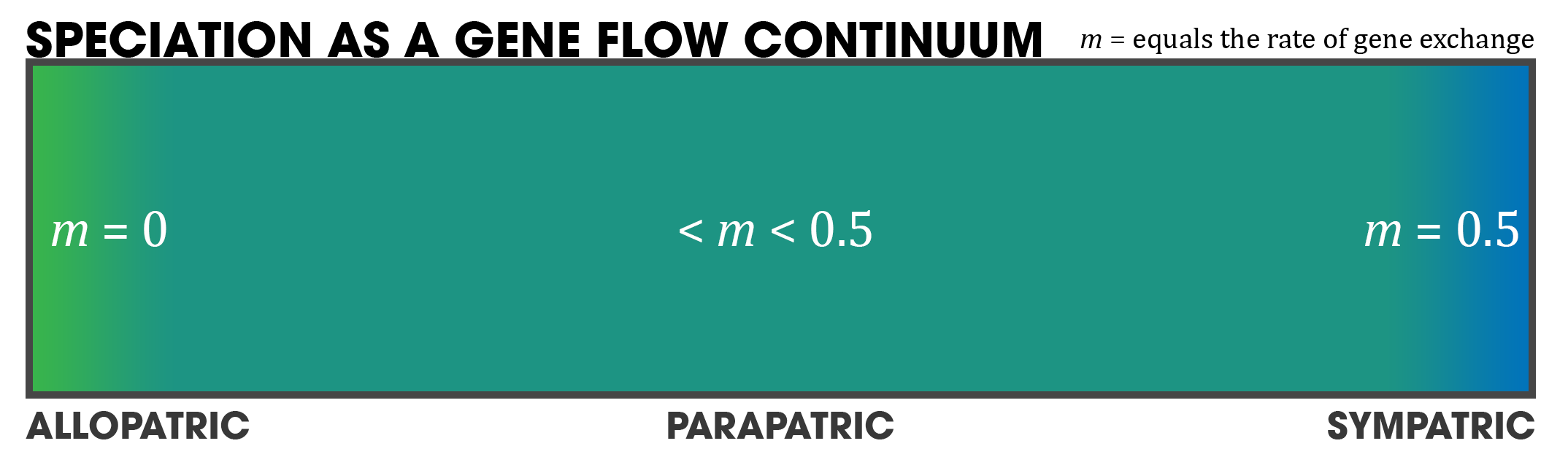
Speciation represented as a continuum of gene flow where $m$ equals the rate of gene exchange. The three primary geographic modes of speciation (allopatric, parapatric, and sympatric) can exist within this continuum, as well as other non-geographic modes.

Because allochronic speciation can occur in conjunction with other modes and forms of speciation, researchers must attempt to determine if the initial stages of isolation were the result of allochrony. The speciation continuum of allopatry, parapatry, and sympatry have all been implicated in studies of temporal isolation. Allochrony can also facilitate reinforcement after secondary contact. The frequency of allochronic speciation is thought to common but understudied as allochrony is widespread in nature.

Testing whether or not allochrony prevents gene flow can be difficult due to the multitude of unknown variables in wild populations and the inability to replicate and manipulate it in laboratory settings. Producing viable, and fertile offspring (or the lack thereof) is not always possible; fortunately, lake of mate tests do not necessarily indicate temporal isolation is not at play. As stated prior, one of the necessary criteria is that the species in question must be sister taxa (or demonstrably incipient). This means that accurate phylogenies are vital to determining the initial stage of a speciation event.

Despite the multitude of studies, it is not always evident whether allochrony is the sole driver of speciation or if other factors acting simultaneously are responsible. This can be more challenging when speciation has already occurred (in that the taxa in question are reproductively isolated and no longer incipient). Determining how important allochrony is as a historical cause of speciation can be tested by: 1) comparative studies that show the young pairs of sister taxa are temporally isolated and 2) testing cases of incipient species in sympatry where reproductive isolation is incomplete without temporal isolation.

Determining if allochrony is the source of divergence require a key pattern to be measured: isolation (and subsequently speciation) should correlate with a decrease in overlapping breeding times. This pattern indicates that daily allochrony is more prone to gene flow (closeness of breeding times can allow accidental intermixing of populations) while yearly allochrony is the least prone to gene flow (accidental intermixing is rare if large time frames exist between mating periods).

== Examples of divergence driven by allochrony ==
The following table documents cases of allochronic speciation. Varying degrees of certainty exist as not all cases strongly meet the three primary criteria necessitated by allochronic speciation. Species marked with an asterisk (*) indicate stronger confidence assessed by Rebecca Taylor and Vicki Friesen (2017).

Studies and examples of allochronic speciation events
Species	Description
Acropora samoensis* and other Acropora spp.*	Japanese corals found to be reproductively isolated by the timing of their spawning. Sympatric species populations of A. samoensis coral spawn separately in the fall and spring with spawning being heritable, likely involving the PaxC gene.
Montastraea annularis*, M. faveolata*, and M. franksi*	Three related species of coral that have speciated due to the timing of their spawning.
Oncorhynchus nerka*, O. gorbuscha*, and O. tshawytscha	Yearly breeding runs of Sockeye salmon occur during two periods in the year (late and early) have caused genetic isolation of incipient populations. Salmon breeding is known to be genetic but no specific genes are known for this species. Even and odd two-year life cycles in conjunction with seasonal breeding runs of pink salmon (O. gorbuscha) has driven genetic differentiation between the two populations. Breeding run times also vary across the population range of the Chinook salmon (O. tshawytscha).
Thaumetopoea pityocampa*	Codominance in genes is associated with the emergence time for larval stages of this moth species. Winter and summer larval populations are in the process of speciating.
Inurois punctigera*	Breeding is prevented in areas where mid-winter temperatures are unsuitable for the moth species. This has given rise to late and early populations.
Pemphigus populi-transversus* and P. obesinymphae*	The gall-forming aphids produce galls on different leaves of the same host tree species. P. populi-transversus forms galls on early spring leaves while P. obesinymphae forms them on leaves in the summer. This has led to full reproductive isolation.
Asphondylia spp.*	Three midge species infect the stems of Larrea tridentata, A. auripila in summer, A. resinosa in winter, and A. foliosa in spring.
Cellana spp.*	Inhabiting different depths within centimeters, the limpets have become reproductively isolated likely due to a combination of parapatric speciation and spawn cues (e.g. spawning according to water level.
Hydrobates spp.*	The petrels group has reproductively isolated (in the Azores) and incipient species (other archipelagos) caused by cool and warm breeding seasons.
Howea belmoreana* and H. forsteriana*	Genetically controlled flowering times have caused (in conjunction with differing soil pH levels) the reproductive isolation of two palm species on Lord Howe Island.
Erysiphe necator*	Exhibits evidence of isolation due to temporal differences of its host species Vitis vinifera.
Magicicada spp.*	Groups of 13- and 17-year life cycle species pairs (seven species total) of cicada emerge to reproduce separated by large time frames between breeding seasons. Only every 221 years do the 13 and 17 year cycles align where both pairs emerge simultaneously.
Antitrogus parvulus*	Two beetle cohorts express genetic differentiation from life cycles separated by two-year intervals.
Oeneis melissa semidea*	Two-year life cycles of the butterfly species breeding groups have caused genetic differentiation.
Bambusoideae*	Bamboo undergo semelparous reproduction where they live for years before mass-flowering at once. This can happen in different years and different locations. Allochronic patches are thought to have driven the diversification of global bamboo species.
Spodoptera frugiperda	A phytophagous example of two moth larvae strains breeding on either corn or rice at different times of the night. Other causes of isolation may be acting on the species. The population in the United States appears to be speciating via allochrony; however the population in Columbia does not.
Anopheles gambiae and A. coluzzii	Controlled by circadian rhythms that stimulate mating, the mosquitos swarm at slightly different times during twilight exhibit some evidence of allochrony, though it is possible that reinforcement or microallopatric speciation is at play.
Bactrocera tryoni and B. neohumeralis	Only laboratory hybridization has been observed between the two Queensland fruit flies, the latter of which mates only during the day time, while the former mates only at night.
Anastrepha bistrigata and A. striata	The fruit flies mate during morning and afternoon respectively. Courtship behavior could also be isolating the two species.
Salmo salar	The age at full maturation as well as genetic differentiation varies between one- and three-year Atlantic salmon (these are the years in which the young fish leave to the ocean and return to their breeding grounds).
Anguilla anguilla	European eels have varying rates that they mature based on environmental factors. This creates separated breeding populations that show some genetic differentiation—notably between 2–3 year breeding intervals.
Cuculus canorus	Allochrony likely plays a role in the Cuckoo bird as they depend on host species for rearing their young. Hosts lay eggs at different times, and cuckoos depend on these timeframes to replace a host bird's eggs.
Antechinus spp.	The marsupial mice respond strongly to photoperiodic cues and in sympatric populations, reproductively isolated species are found to breed at different times.
Coregonus clupeaformis	The lake whitefish has two known forms, normal and dwarf. They have different spawning times but may have diverged in allopatry.
Exapion ulicis and E. lemovicinum	E. lemovicinum infects Ulex minor and U. gallii plants while E. ulicis infects U. europaeus. The timing in which they lay eggs on the plant occurs in fall and spring respectively.
Meconopsis autumnalis and M. paniculata	Himalayan poppy are a fully reproductively isolated species thought to have speciated through allochrony as they exist in sympatry and flower at different times in the season.
Cordia spp.	Some of the species in the genus exhibit significant variation in flowering times.
Hesperiidae	It is thought that temporal isolation is responsible for speciation in many of the 400 skipper butterfly species studied.
Bryopsidales spp.	The green algae reproduces by releasing gametes at different times. This is thought to have driven reproductive isolation, but it is unclear if it is genetically controlled or based purely on environmental cues.
Chilo suppressalis	Mate timing occurs at different intervals at night as well as dependence on different host plants.
Prodoxus quinquepunctellus	Host races of the moths inhabit Adam's needle and thread yucca with larval emergence occurring in conjunction with flowering time. It is thought that morphology and host-shifting contribute alongside allochrony.
Gryllus pennsylvanicus and G. veletis	The spring field crickets have been described as speciating in allochrony due to their maturation timing. However more recent studies indicate that they are not sister species.
Haemaphysalis spp. and Dermacentor spp.	Three Hungarian tick species in the Haemaphysalis genus exhibit mating activity in sympatry during three seasonal periods, late fall, late spring, and early spring. Two tick species in the Dermacentor genus show peak activity in fall and spring.
Strauzia longipennis	Genetic variation is detected in three sunflower maggot fly variants that inhabit the same host plant. Their larval emergence occurs in three distinct periods of the summer keeping them partially isolated. Experimental manipulation suggests allochrony will increase as they continue to diverge.
Enchenopa binotata complex	The phenology of members in the treehopper species complex is correlated with their host plants—when changing host species in experiment, the treehopper egg hatching time changes promoting assortive mating.
Milicia excelsa	With flowering time of the African teak thought to be genetically controlled, the population exhibits isolation.
Asteralobia sasakii	Two populations of Cecidomyiidae gall midges differ substantially in emergence time (with no overlap) on two different Ilex hosts.
Salix spp.	The Canadian willow species are found to isolated by flowering time; three of which flower early (S. bebbiana, S. discolor, S. eriocephala, and S. petiolaris) and late (S. amygdaloides, S. exigua, and S. lucida). Hybrids are not known outside of laboratory settings and exhibit intermediate flowering times. All seven species exist in sympatric distributions.
Juncus effusus	Sympatric populations of genetically differentiated plants flower at different times preventing hybridization. It is unclear if speciation is occurring by allochrony as reinforcement may be a stronger explanation.
Agrostis tenuis	The grass species A. tenuis grows on soil contaminated with high levels of copper leached from an unused mine. Adjacent is the non-contaminated soil. The populations are evolving reproductive isolation due to differences in flowering time.
Anthoxanthum odoratum	The grass species A. odoratum grows on soil contaminated with high levels of lead and zinc leached from an unused mine. Adjacent is the non-contaminated soil. The populations are evolving reproductive isolation due to differences in flowering time.
Chironomus nuditarsis	The non-biting midge (genus Chironomus) exhibits differences in life cycle in accordance with elevation.
Terellia fuscicornis	Differences in courtship behavior as well as morphology are found in populations that infect different hosts (Silybum marianumand Cynara) that bloom at different times.
Ampelomyces spp.	Genetically different strains of the mycoparasitic fungus that infects apple powdery mildew completes their lifecycle before other strains that infect other mildew hosts.
Glycine max and G. soja	Wild soybean (G. soja) and cultivated soybean (G. max) can be prevented from hybridizing by inducing asynchrony in flowering time. This study is unique in that it is not an example of allochronic speciation, but instead an experiment demonstrating that allochrony can be experimentally applied to induce isolation.
Parasitoid wasps: Rhagoletis pomonella, Rhagoletis mendax, Diachasma alloeum, Diachasmimorpha mellea, and Utetes canaliculatus	In R. pomonella (one of the most researched, model organisms), genetic data indicates heritability of emergence and its associated flight time. In commercial blueberry fields versus wild ones, the populations of R. mendax differ in their flight periods causing a reduction in gene flow. Other Rhagoletis species that host on Crataegus show similar patterns. Cospeciation of the parasitoid wasps (D. alloeum, D. mellea, and U. canaliculatus) and their host plant apple maggot has been induced by host-shifts caused by various factors such as timing of its egg hatching, fruit smell preference, philopatry, and avoidance. The egg hatching timing factor implicates allochrony.
Eurosta solidaginis	Two populations of goldenrod gall fly differ in their emergence periods on their host plants Solidago altissima and S. gigantea by 10 to 14 days preventing hybridization and causing isolation.
Falco sparverius	Kestrels of Idaho have both migrating and year-round residents with the year-round population nesting earlier generating assortive mating.
Sylvia atricapilla	Some genetic differentiation exists between blackcap populations that migrate to the United Kingdom and Ireland versus those that migrate to Iberia. The birds breed in sympatry in Germany; however, the UK and Ireland populations migrate back earlier causing assortive mating. Hybrids end up with intermediate migration routes.
Junco hyemalis hyemalis and J. h. carolinensis	Photoperiodic cues drive earlier development of the gonads in J. h. carolinensis of whom migrate to a different region to breed while only residing sympatrically with J. h. hyemalis birds for half of the year.
Daphnia pulex and D. pulicaria	Very limited isolation is detected between the two water flea species (D. pulicaria is within the D. pulex complex) possibly the result of reproductive timing based on photoperiodic cues.
Tibicina	Habitat isolation, allochrony, and allopatry were identified in various pairs of seven species and subspecies of the genus (T. Corsica Corsica, T. Corsica fairmairei, T. garricola, T haematodes, T. nigronervosa, T. quadrisignata, and T. tomentosa).
Kaltenbachiella japonica	The galling aphids depend on the budding of Japanese elm to hatch. Incipient populations have arisen due to changes in the budding times of the host plant.
Scolioneura betuleti and S. vicina	The leaf-mining sawflies, despite being very similar, show some evidence of divergence due to seasonal flying (fall and spring respectively).
Papilio canadensis and P. glaucus	The two butterfly species have hybridized creating a hybrid population that breeds during a different time than the parent populations. Genetic evidence indicates that genes control the timing of reproduction.
Tyrannus savana	Fork-tailed flycatcher populations are diverging due to isolation by a change in breeding times and breeding grounds as a result of a loss of migratory behavior.
Ostrinia nubilalis	Corn borer moth strains breed at differing times of the night are considered to be incipient, however it is unclear if allochrony is exclusively causing isolation. Seasonal breeding may keep North American populations isolated as the number of yearly broods (voltinism) between the two strains. Sympatric to each other, Z strain is monovoltine (having a single brood in a year) and the E strain is divoltine (having two broods in a year). In Europe, there is a correlation between larval emergence time and the host plant.
New World bird species	In an experiment testing the Asynchrony of Seasons Hypothesis (see section below), 57 different bird species found across the New World (North and South America) were found to express increased genetic differentiation in correlation with living in areas that have asynchronous precipitation.

=== Asynchrony of Seasons Hypothesis ===
A noteworthy and significant pattern in nature is that of latitudinal gradients in species diversity. where species' richness (biodiversity) increases closer to Earth's equator. It is thought that one contributing factor is that rates of speciation are higher in these regions across the planet. The Asynchrony of Seasons Hypothesis is proposed to be a contributing factor to higher speciation rates as it relates directly to that of allochronic speciation. The hypothesis proposes that the pattern is a result of a lack of synchrony with seasonal variations in tropical regions.

In high-latitude regions, various taxa experience similar temperatures and solar radiation in cyclic patterns due to Earth's axial tilt—generating seasons that are not found at the equator. Because of this, populations of a species have phenologies that are generally synchronous across a range allowing for unimpeded dispersal and subsequent gene flow. This results in less divergence between populations; ultimately reducing rates of speciation (and overall biodiversity).

In contrast with this, latitudes near or at the equator (tropics) experience asynchrony in seasonal variation in that the regions receive similar amounts of solar radiation and maintain consistence temperature. What does change is precipitation patterns, as they can be sporadic, scattered, and vary over very short distances. This pattern causes asynchrony in the phenologies of species populations that can ultimately act as a temporally isolating barrier to reproduction. This prevents gene flow between populations and can drive divergence, speciation, and an increase in biodiversity.

A large scale test of the hypothesis was conducted on fifty-seven New World bird species across South, Central, and North America. The findings, using DNA, geographic and ecological distances, as well as climatic data, indicated that genetic differentiation increased in species populations where asynchrony in precipitation was present. A similar pattern was found in another study of forty-eight neotropical frogs.
