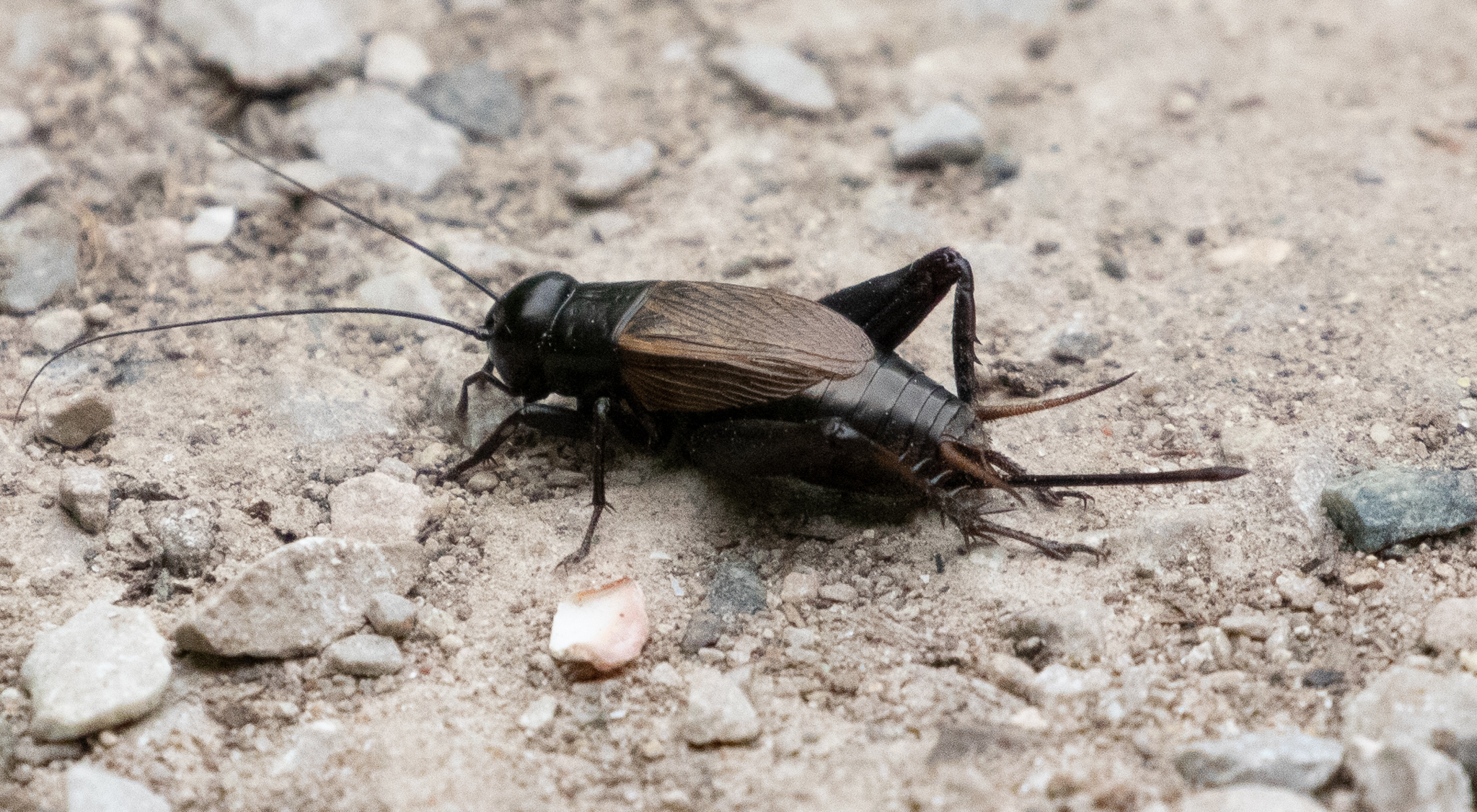

Scientific classification
- Kingdom: Animalia
- Phylum: Arthropoda
- Clade: Pancrustacea
- Class: Insecta
- Order: Orthoptera
- Suborder: Ensifera
- Family: Gryllidae
- Genus: Gryllus
- Species: G. veletis

Binomial name
- Gryllus veletis Alexander & Bigelow, 1960

= Gryllus veletis =

Species of cricket

Gryllus veletis is commonly known as the spring field cricket. This solitary, aggressive, omnivorous, burrow-inhabiting species is the most widespread field cricket in North America. It is commonly confused with Gryllus pennsylvanicus (the fall field cricket), over much of the continent, but can be distinguished through examination of life history, ovipositor and behavioural differences. Predators of G. veletis include American toads, wild turkeys, red-tailed hawks, wolf spiders and red-backed salamanders.

== Taxonomy and nomenclature ==
This species was first described as Acheta veletis by Alexander and Bigelow with Piatt County, Illinois listed as the type locality. Gryllus is Greek and Latin for cricket, while veletis comes from the Latin word veles, velitis [sic], meaning light-armed footsoldier, skirmisher, or guerrilla forces, in reference to its aggressive behaviour as compared with G. pennsylvanicus. Alexander later stated that the spelling was modified to veletis to match the middle e in Acheta.

When first described, G. veletis was thought to be derived from G. pennsylvanicus via allochronic speciation. Subsequent genetic studies have instead found G. veletis to group with G. planeta, a restricted-range species found in Texas, albeit with weak support. G. pennsylvanicus, by contrast, is in a clade with G. firmus, the sand field cricket.

== Identification ==
Adult body length measures approximately 22.0 mm (0.87 inches)., though this is variable, with specimens from west Texas twice the length of those from North Dakota. Males of this species are black with dark brown or black appendages. Females are similar in colour and have a dark brown ovipositor, measuring approximately 14 mm (0.55 inches). Female colouration differs from males as they have lighter, more reddish legs.

All species of field crickets generally look similar, with minor distinctions in morphological characteristics (i.e. coloration, ovipositor length, etc.) aiding in species identification. The male's song also plays an important role, helping distinguish mates and conspecifics from other species of crickets in the area. Where found with G. pennsylvanicus, the song of G. veletis can sometimes be distinguished by a faster pulse rate, caused by a smaller number of teeth in the stridulatory file. A recording of the spring field cricket's song can be heard here.

== Natural history ==
=== Distribution ===
Gryllus veletis is abundant in much of North America, and was found in a recent study to be the most geographically widespread of its genus on the continent. Within the United States, Weissman and Gray found it absent only from the southeastern states. West of the Cascade Range and the Sierra Nevada, it is replaced by G. veletisoides, which is however not a sister species. Alexander and Bigelow report it from southern Canada to northern Georgia, but Walker does not have records from the southeast United States. G. veletis occurs in the same areas as G. pennsylvanicus, but the spring field cricket does not reach as far north as Nova Scotia, Canada. G. veletis can be found in disturbed habitats such as old fields and weedy roadsides.

=== Life cycle and mating behaviour ===
Spring field crickets are sexually mature from late May to early August. Males of the species attract sexually receptive females by acoustic signals, known as stridulation. This process occurs by rubbing two rigid veins on the wings against one another. One vein is a scraper (smooth surface), the other a file (rough surface). The wings are held at a 45 degree angle above the thorax to amplify the sound. Calling tends to peak at sunrise and lasts between 1.3 and 1.8 hours per night. However, if nighttime temperatures drop below 10 °C (50 °F), calling will switch to the daytime. At 29 °C (85 °F), the cricket will call at 120–370 chirps per minute, in a series of 3 to 5-pulse chirps. When a female is within the vicinity of a male’s territory, a quieter song (known as a courtship song) is used to reduce the risk of predation and attraction of male competitors. Both males and females have directional hearing. Tympanums on the front legs pick up the vibrations created by the chirps. Depending on the strength, and on which leg the vibration is received, the location of the caller can be determined.

Once mating occurs, females use their ovipositor to lay eggs into a soil substrate. The eggs will mature between June and September. The immature spring field cricket will continue to develop into a late-instar nymph and overwinter in this stage until emergence as adults in late May. G. veletis therefore undergoes one generation per year.

== Human impact ==
Field crickets, including G. veletis, are generally omnivorous scavengers. Their diet normally consists of plants, both fresh and decaying, other dead insects and in some cases predation of other field crickets or live insects may occur. An example of field cricket predation is seen in the consumption of fly pupae, which helps reduce the population of flies, often viewed as pests by humans. Consumption of plant matter helps ensure that fallen leaves and other material does not accumulate. Along with other scavengers (i.e. earthworms, beetles, etc.) decomposition of plants into fertile soil helps maintain a balanced ecosystem in forests and fields.

Unlike house crickets (Acheta domesticus), field crickets are not able to adapt to a residential environment due to constraints in their life history traits and consequently, the insect will not live through the winter. Though field crickets are not normally found in home environments, they may invade a home to seek refuge from poor weather, attraction to light, or in search of foodstuffs (i.e. grains, seeds, etc.). Entrance can be gained through small cracks and crevices leading into a building. Once inside, damage to nylon, wool, plastic and leather fabrics may occur. The field cricket does not consume these materials, but "cuts out" a path through which it may pass. The human inhabitant may be aggravated by the field cricket's nocturnal chirping.
