= Leidyana erratica =

Scientific classification
- Domain: Eukaryota
- (unranked): SAR
- (unranked): Alveolata
- Phylum: Apicomplexa
- Class: Conoidasida
- Order: Eugregarinorida
- Family: Leidyanidae
- Genus: Leidyana
- Species: L. erraticum

Binomial name
- Leidyana erratica

Species of single-celled organism

Leidyana erratica is a single-celled, eukaryotic parasite of the cricket Gryllus pennsylvanicus.
