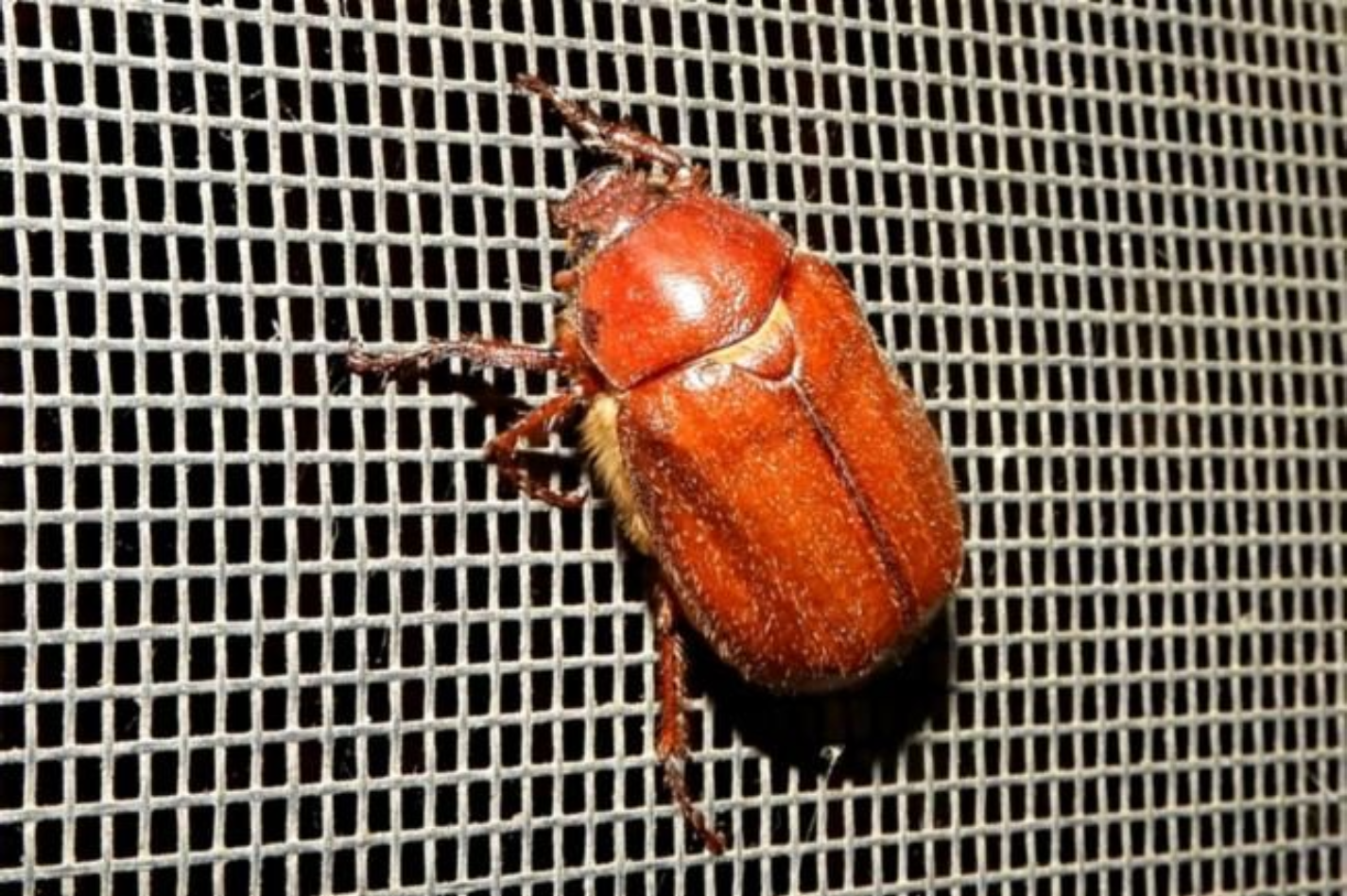

Scientific classification
- Kingdom: Animalia
- Phylum: Arthropoda
- Clade: Pancrustacea
- Class: Insecta
- Order: Coleoptera
- Suborder: Polyphaga
- Infraorder: Scarabaeiformia
- Family: Scarabaeidae
- Tribe: Melolonthini
- Genus: Antitrogus
- Species: A. morbillosus

Binomial name
- Antitrogus morbillosus (Blackburn, 1898)

Synonyms
- Rhopaea morbillosa Blackburn, 1898; Rhopaea incognita Blackburn, 1911

= Antitrogus morbillosus =

Species of beetle

Antitrogus morbillosus, the tableland pasture scarab, is a species of beetle of the family Scarabaeidae. It is found in Australia (New South Wales and Victoria).

== Description ==
Adults reach a length of about 20–26 mm (0.79–1.02 in). The body and legs are uniform bright reddish brown. The antennae and palpi are as in Antitrogus robertsi.

== Life history ==
This species is a pest of pastures, with the larvae damaging grasses and legumes. Recorded host plants include Trifolium repens and Philaris tuberosa. Adults have been recorded from November to January.
