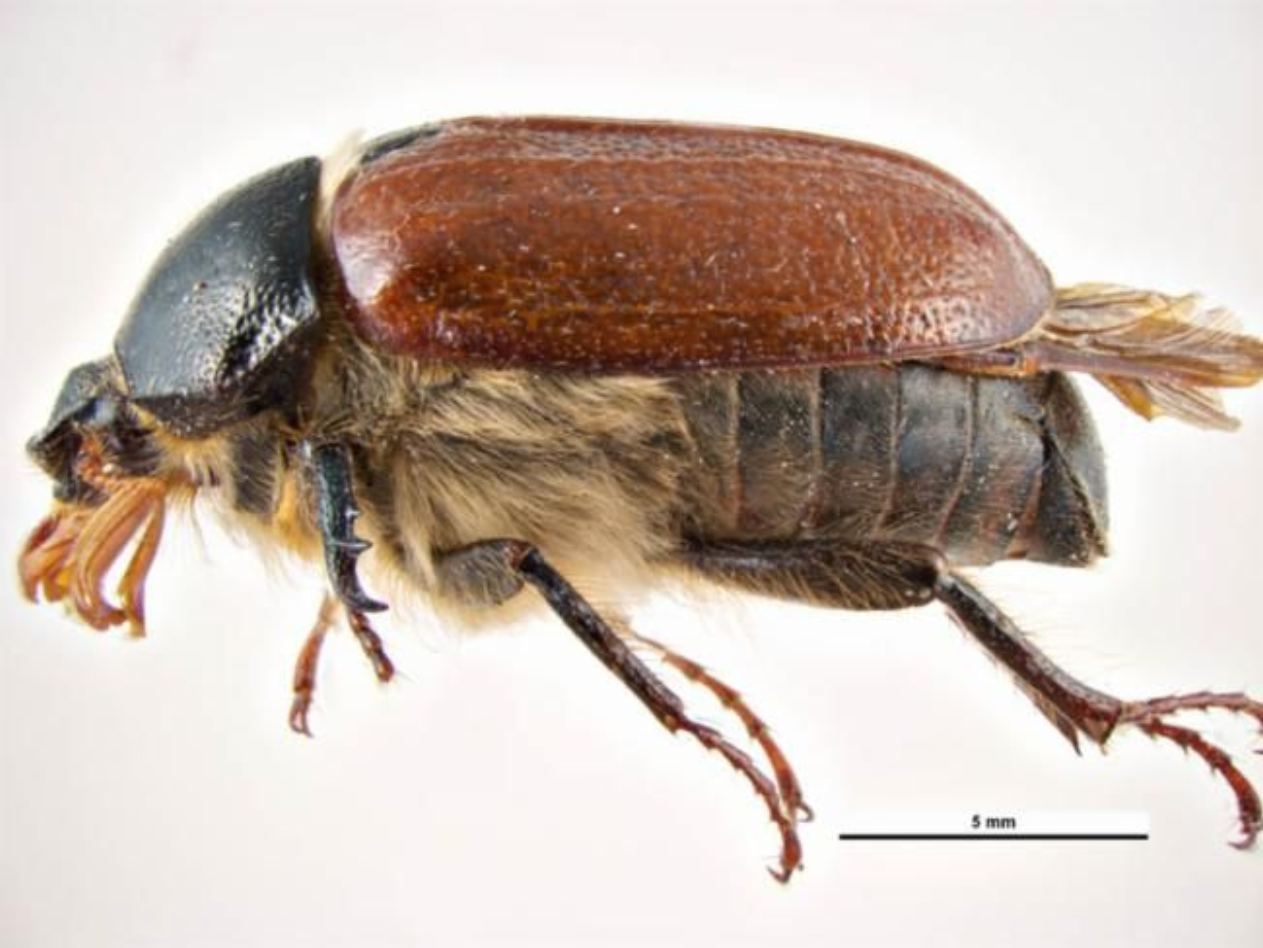

Scientific classification
- Kingdom: Animalia
- Phylum: Arthropoda
- Clade: Pancrustacea
- Class: Insecta
- Order: Coleoptera
- Suborder: Polyphaga
- Infraorder: Scarabaeiformia
- Family: Scarabaeidae
- Tribe: Melolonthini
- Genus: Antitrogus
- Species: A. carnei

Binomial name
- Antitrogus carnei Britton, 1978

= Antitrogus carnei =

Species of beetle

Antitrogus carnei is a species of beetle of the family Scarabaeidae. It is found in Australia (Victoria, New South Wales).

== Description ==
Adults reach a length of about 16–18 mm (0.63–0.71 in). The head, pronotum and scutellum are black, while the elytra are dark brown to black, and the abdomen and legs dark reddish brown to black. The antennae are yellowish brown, with the lamellae very pale.

== Life history ==
Adults have been recorded from December to January.
