= Antitrogus circulifrons =

Scientific classification
- Kingdom: Animalia
- Phylum: Arthropoda
- Clade: Pancrustacea
- Class: Insecta
- Order: Coleoptera
- Suborder: Polyphaga
- Infraorder: Scarabaeiformia
- Family: Scarabaeidae
- Tribe: Melolonthini
- Genus: Antitrogus
- Species: A. circulifrons

Binomial name
- Antitrogus circulifrons Britton, 1978

Species of beetle

Antitrogus circulifrons is a species of beetle of the family Scarabaeidae. It is found in Australia (northern New South Wales, southern Queensland).

== Description ==
Adults reach a length of about 19 mm (0.75 in). They are light reddish brown, with the antennal club pale yellowish brown.

== Life history ==
Adults have been recorded from November to December.
