= Antitrogus nox =

Scientific classification
- Kingdom: Animalia
- Phylum: Arthropoda
- Clade: Pancrustacea
- Class: Insecta
- Order: Coleoptera
- Suborder: Polyphaga
- Infraorder: Scarabaeiformia
- Family: Scarabaeidae
- Tribe: Melolonthini
- Genus: Antitrogus
- Species: A. nox

Binomial name
- Antitrogus nox Britton, 1978

Species of beetle

Antitrogus nox is a species of beetle of the family Scarabaeidae. It is found in Australia (mid-coastal region of New South Wales).

== Description ==
Adults reach a length of about 21 mm (0.83 in). The head, pronotum and scutellum are black, while the elytra, abdomen and legs are very dark brown. The antennae and palpi are brown.

== Life history ==
Adults have been recorded in March.
