= Antitrogus setifer =

Scientific classification
- Kingdom: Animalia
- Phylum: Arthropoda
- Clade: Pancrustacea
- Class: Insecta
- Order: Coleoptera
- Suborder: Polyphaga
- Infraorder: Scarabaeiformia
- Family: Scarabaeidae
- Tribe: Melolonthini
- Genus: Antitrogus
- Species: A. setifer

Binomial name
- Antitrogus setifer Britton, 1978

Species of beetle

Antitrogus setifer is a species of beetle of the family Scarabaeidae. It is found in Australia (central coast of Queensland).

== Description ==
Adults reach a length of about 16 mm (0.63 in). The head, pronotum and scutellum are bright reddish yellow, while the elytra and abdomen are yellowish brown and the antennal lamellae are pale yellowish brown.

== Life history ==
Adults have been recorded in October.
