= Antitrogus adamsi =

Scientific classification
- Kingdom: Animalia
- Phylum: Arthropoda
- Clade: Pancrustacea
- Class: Insecta
- Order: Coleoptera
- Suborder: Polyphaga
- Infraorder: Scarabaeiformia
- Family: Scarabaeidae
- Tribe: Melolonthini
- Genus: Antitrogus
- Species: A. adamsi

Binomial name
- Antitrogus adamsi Britton, 1978

Species of beetle

Antitrogus adamsi is a species of beetle of the family Scarabaeidae. It is found in Australia (coast of central Queensland).

== Description ==
Adults reach a length of about 17 mm (0.67 in). The head, pronotum, scutellum, ventral surface of the thorax, pygidium and legs are black or very dark brown, while the elytra and abdomen are reddish brown and the antennae are pale yellowish brown (with the basal segment brown towards the apex).

== Life history ==
Adults have been recorded in September.
