= Antitrogus tumidifrons =

Scientific classification
- Kingdom: Animalia
- Phylum: Arthropoda
- Clade: Pancrustacea
- Class: Insecta
- Order: Coleoptera
- Suborder: Polyphaga
- Infraorder: Scarabaeiformia
- Family: Scarabaeidae
- Tribe: Melolonthini
- Genus: Antitrogus
- Species: A. tumidifrons

Binomial name
- Antitrogus tumidifrons Britton, 1978

Species of beetle

Antitrogus tumidifrons is a species of beetle of the family Scarabaeidae. It is found in Australia (New South Wales).

== Description ==
Adults reach a length of about 17–20 mm (0.67–0.79 in). The head, pronotum and legs are bright reddish brown, while the elytra and ventral surface are yellowish brown.

== Life history ==
Adults have been recorded in October.
