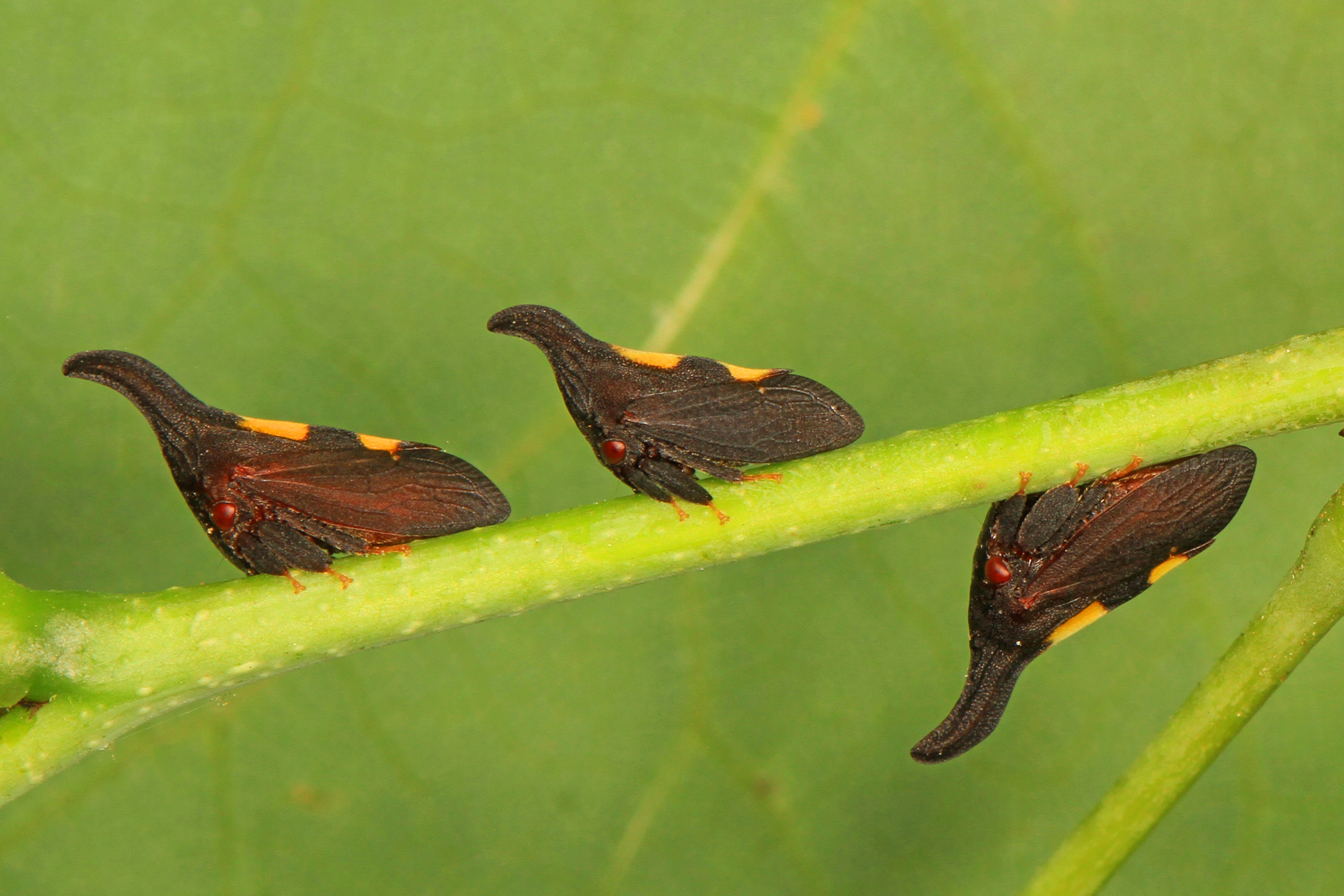
- Enchenopa binotata complex

Scientific classification
- Kingdom: Animalia
- Phylum: Arthropoda
- Class: Insecta
- Order: Hemiptera
- Suborder: Auchenorrhyncha
- Family: Membracidae
- Subfamily: Membracinae
- Tribe: Membracini
- Genus: Enchenopa; Amyot & Audinet-Serville, 1843

= Enchenopa =

Genus of true bugs

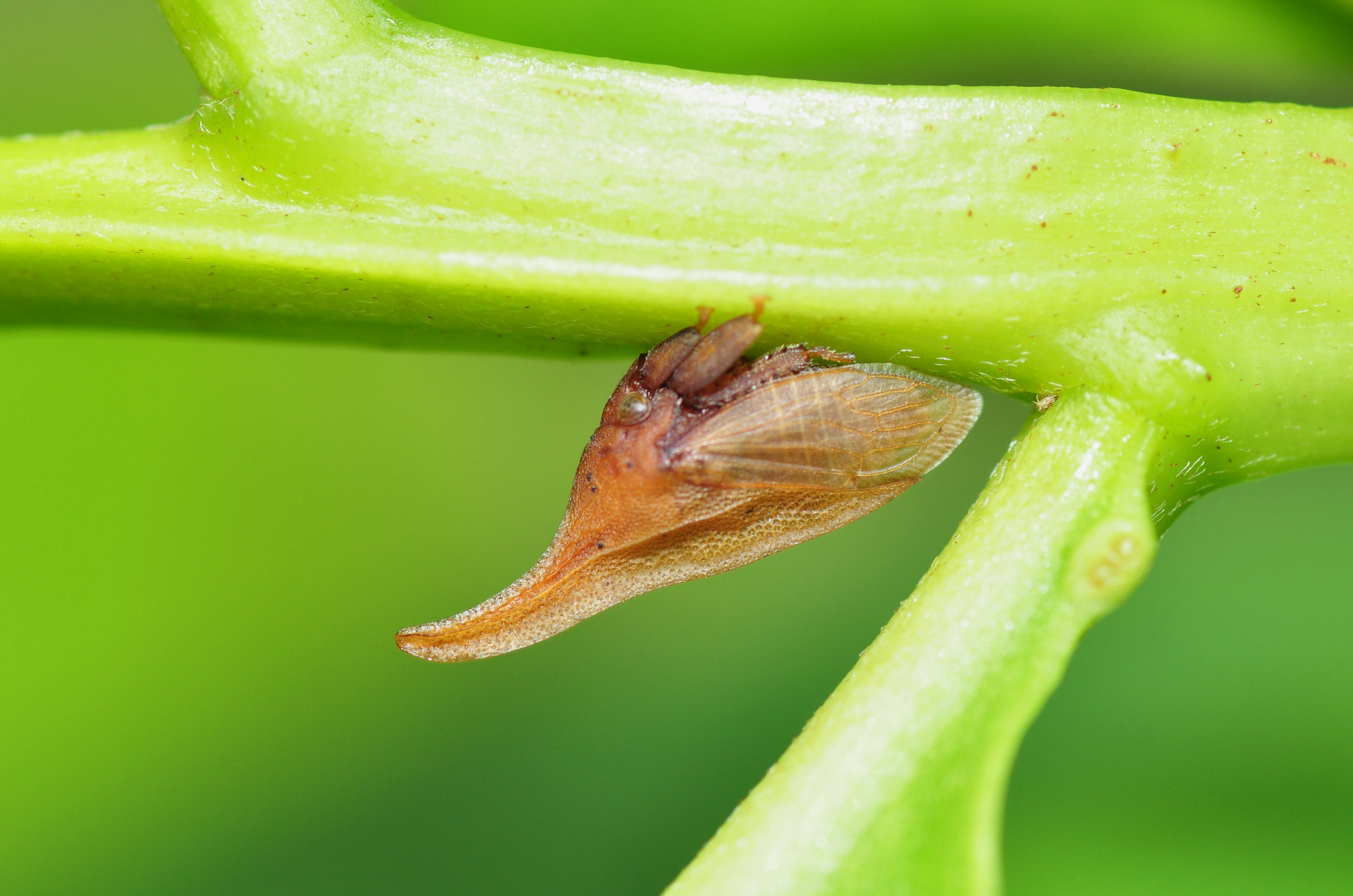
Enchenopa squamigera

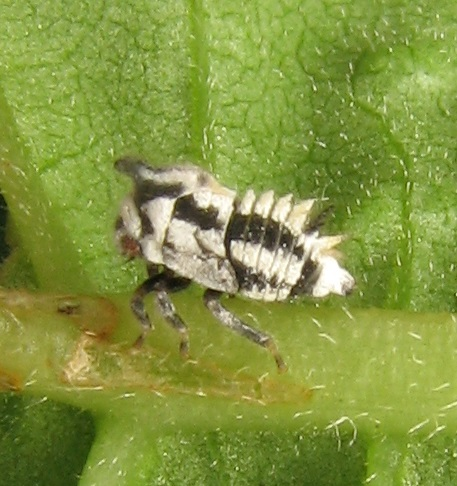
Nymph, on walnut tree.

Enchenopa is a genus of treehoppers in the family Membracidae. There are more than 50 described species in Enchenopa.

The genus underwent a major revision 2014, resulting in 51 species. Enchenopa binotata is a species complex made up of multiple species, often identified by their host plants.

== Species ==
These species belong to the genus Enchenopa:

- Enchenopa albidorsa (Fairmaire, 1846)
- Enchenopa albifrons Strümpel et al., 2014
- Enchenopa amazonensis Strümpel et al., 2014
- Enchenopa andina Schmidt, 1924
- Enchenopa ansera Funkhouser, 1943
- Enchenopa anseriformis Strümpel et al., 2014
- Enchenopa auridorsa Sakakibara & Marques, 2007
- Enchenopa beebei (Haviland, 1925)
- Enchenopa binotata (Say, 1824) (two-marked treehopper, species complex)
- Enchenopa biplaga Walker, 1858
- Enchenopa brasiliensis Strumpel & Strumpel, 2007
- Enchenopa castanea Strümpel et al., 2014
- Enchenopa concolor (Fairmaire, 1846)
- Enchenopa costaricensis Schmidt 1924
- Enchenopa cuneata Strümpel et al., 2014
- Enchenopa curvata (Fabricius, 1803)
- Enchenopa dubia (Fowler, 1894)
- Enchenopa euniceae Rothéa & Creão-Duarte, 2007
- Enchenopa eurycephala Strümpel et al., 2014
- Enchenopa fusca Sakakibara & Marques, 2007
- Enchenopa gladius (Fabricius, 1803)
- Enchenopa gracilis (Germar, 1821)
- Enchenopa grandis Strümpel et al., 2014
- Enchenopa ignidorsum Walker, 1858
- Enchenopa lanceolata (Fabricius 1787)
- Enchenopa latipes (Say, 1824) (wide-footed treehopper)
- Enchenopa longicollum (Olivier, 1792)
- Enchenopa longimaculata Strümpel et al., 2014
- Enchenopa longula Strümpel et al., 2014
- Enchenopa loranthacina Sakakibara & Marques, 2010
- Enchenopa minuta Rothéa & Creão-Duarte, 2007
- Enchenopa monoceros (Germar, 1821)
- Enchenopa montana Strümpel et al., 2014
- Enchenopa multicarinata Fowler, 1894
- Enchenopa pachycornuta Strümpel et al., 2014
- Enchenopa permutata Van Duzee, 1908
- Enchenopa pichinchaensis Strümpel et al., 2014
- Enchenopa pilosa Strümpel et al., 2014
- Enchenopa pittieri Strümpel et al., 2014
- Enchenopa quadricolor Walker, 1858
- Enchenopa quadrimaculata Walker, 1858
- Enchenopa reclinata Strümpel et al., 2014
- Enchenopa recticornuta Strümpel et al., 2014
- Enchenopa richteri Strümpel et al., 2014
- Enchenopa schremmeri Strümpel et al., 2014
- Enchenopa sericea Walker, 1851
- Enchenopa serrata Strümpel et al., 2014
- Enchenopa singularis Strümpel et al., 2014
- Enchenopa squamigera (Linné, 1758)
- Enchenopa subtilis Strümpel et al., 2014
- Enchenopa vittifera Stål, 1869
