= Antitrogus politus =

Scientific classification
- Kingdom: Animalia
- Phylum: Arthropoda
- Clade: Pancrustacea
- Class: Insecta
- Order: Coleoptera
- Suborder: Polyphaga
- Infraorder: Scarabaeiformia
- Family: Scarabaeidae
- Tribe: Melolonthini
- Genus: Antitrogus
- Species: A. politus

Binomial name
- Antitrogus politus (Lea, 1920)

Synonyms
- Rhopaea polita Lea, 1920

Species of beetle

Antitrogus politus is a species of beetle of the family Scarabaeidae. It is found in Australia (southern Queensland).

== Description ==
Adults reach a length of about 21 mm (0.83 in). The head and pronotum are pale reddish brown, while the elytra and abdomen are yellowish brown.

== Life history ==
Adults have been recorded from November to December.
