= Antitrogus costai =

Scientific classification
- Kingdom: Animalia
- Phylum: Arthropoda
- Clade: Pancrustacea
- Class: Insecta
- Order: Coleoptera
- Suborder: Polyphaga
- Infraorder: Scarabaeiformia
- Family: Scarabaeidae
- Tribe: Melolonthini
- Genus: Antitrogus
- Species: A. costai

Binomial name
- Antitrogus costai Allsopp, 1993

Species of beetle

Antitrogus costai is a species of beetle of the family Scarabaeidae. It is found in Australia (central Queensland).

== Description ==
Adults reach a length of about 21–22 mm (0.83–0.87 in). The head, pronotum and legs are brown, while the scutellum, elytra and venter are yellowish-brown.

== Life history ==
Adults have been recorded in late October.
