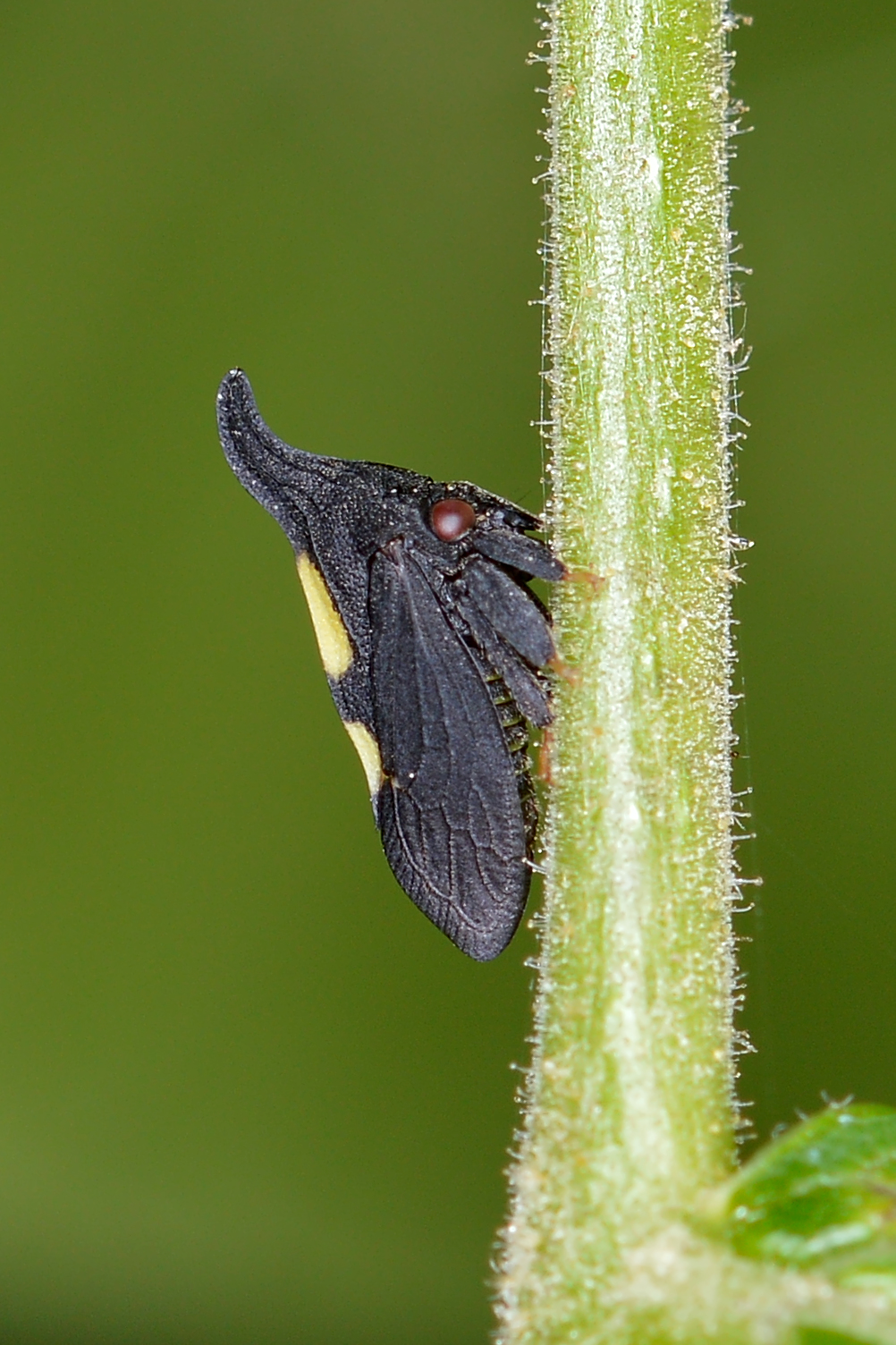

Scientific classification
- Kingdom: Animalia
- Phylum: Arthropoda
- Class: Insecta
- Order: Hemiptera
- Family: Membracidae
- Genus: Enchenopa
- Species complex: E. binotata

Binomial name
- Enchenopa binotata
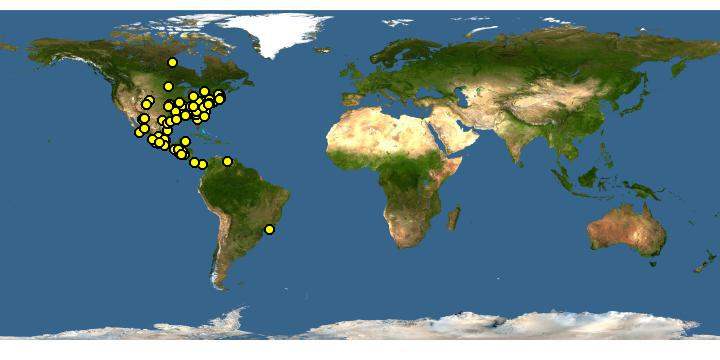
- Map showing the distribution of E. binotata

= Enchenopa binotata complex =

Species of true bug

Enchenopa binotata (Hemiptera: Membraciade) is a complex of multiple species found mostly in Eastern North America, but have also been reported in Central America. They are commonly referred to as treehoppers and are sap-feeding insects. The species in the complex look similar to each other in morphology, but are identified as different species by the host plant they occupy.

== Biology ==
=== Morphology ===
Nymphs (juveniles) of E. binotata start out to be ≤1mm with gray and black coloration. Nymphs have 5 instars until they molt into adulthood, which can take 3–4 weeks. As adults, they can range from 7-9mm in size. and have two yellow markings on their back. Their species name is derived from these two markings; bi-, meaning "two", -notata, meaning "to mark". They form thornlike structures on their head called a pronotum. These treehoppers are true bugs, belonging to the order Hemiptera, which all share a common mouth morphology; sucking mouthparts.

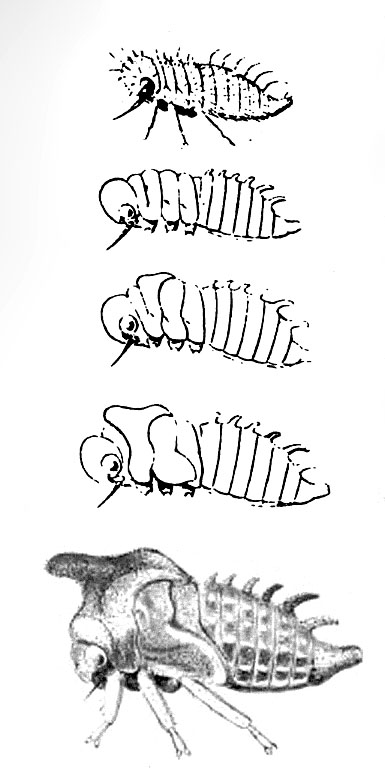
Nymph progression of E. binotata

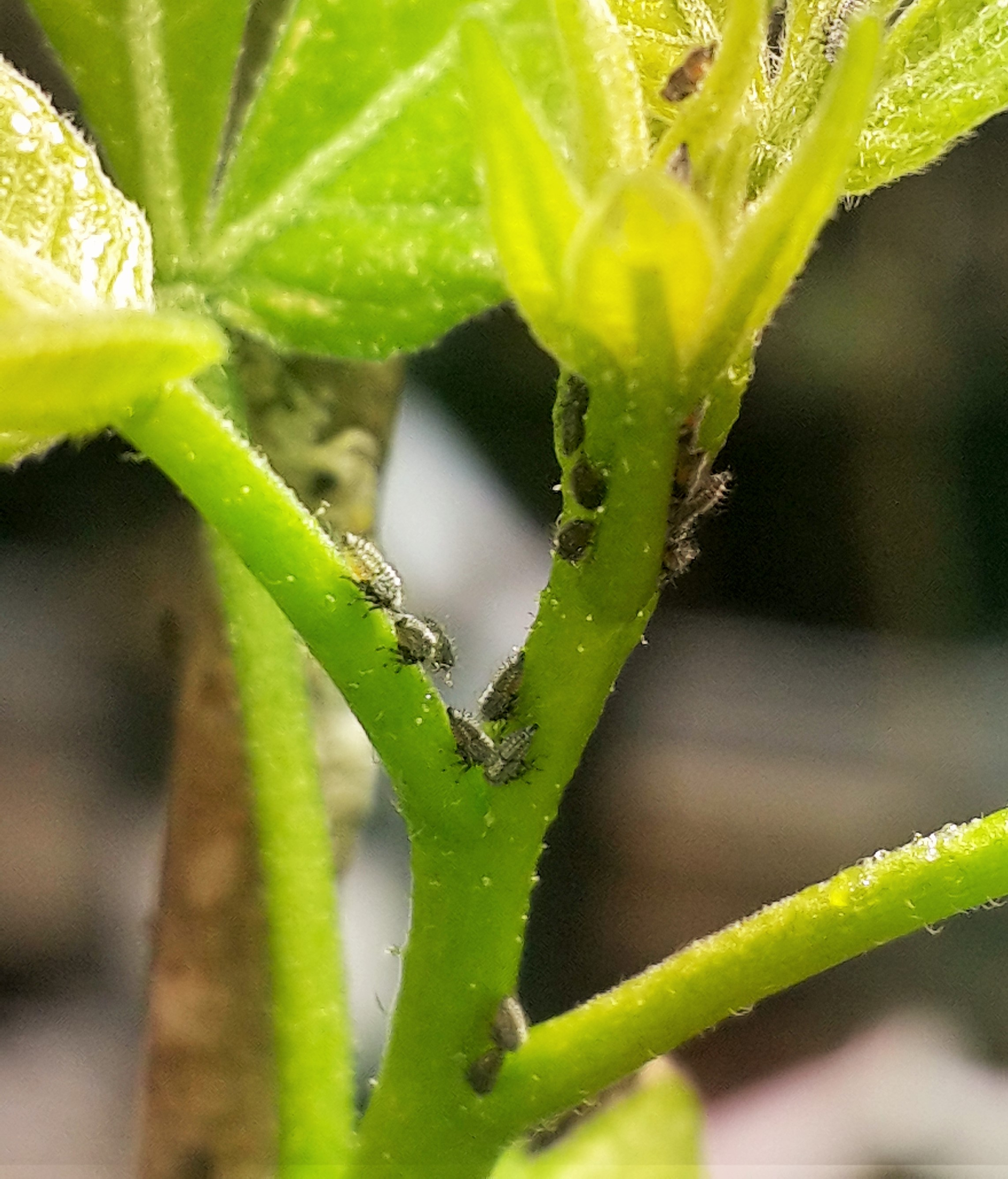
Nymphs (juvenile) E. binotata treehoppers on Ptelea trifoliata(wafer ash)

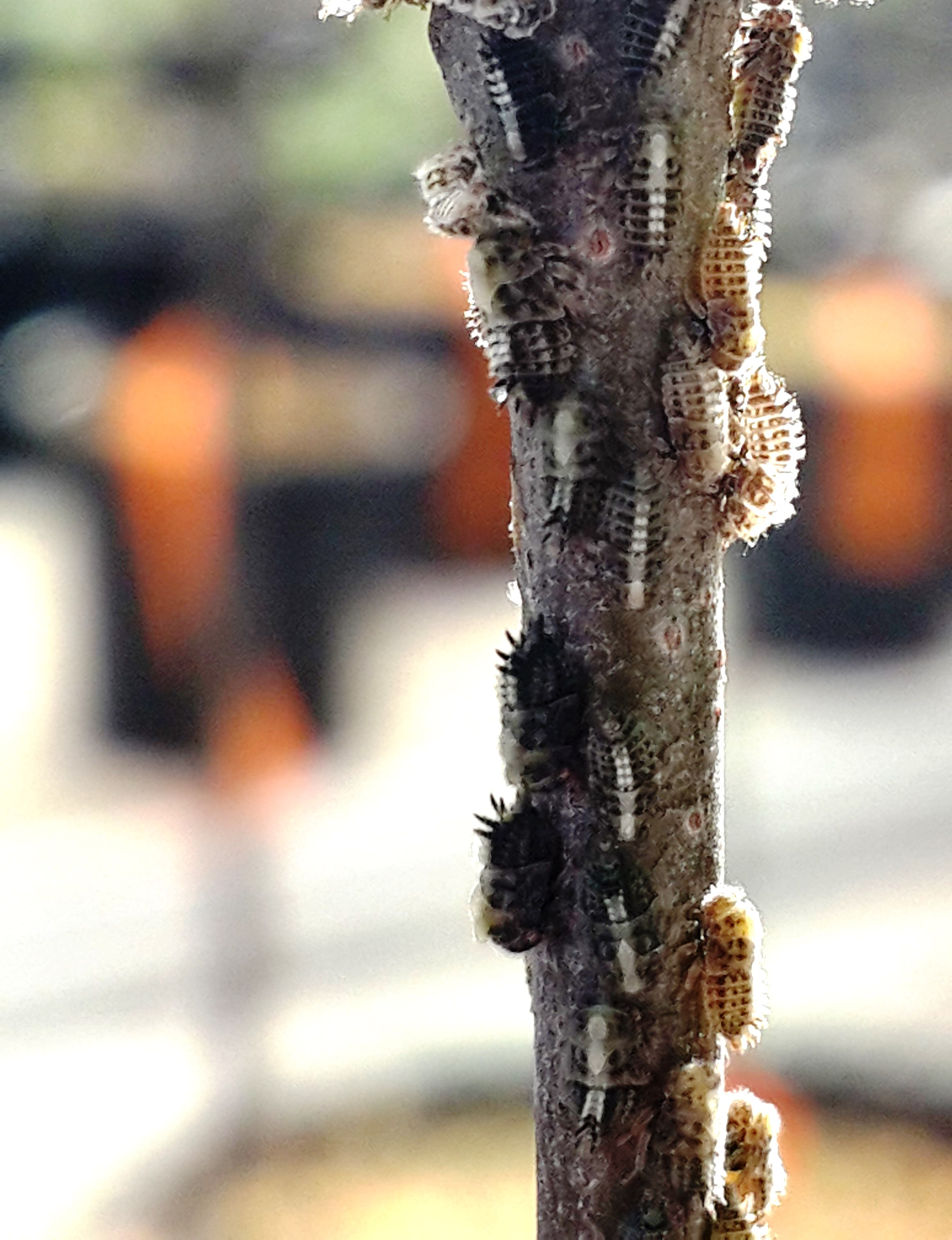
Older nymphs on wafer ash

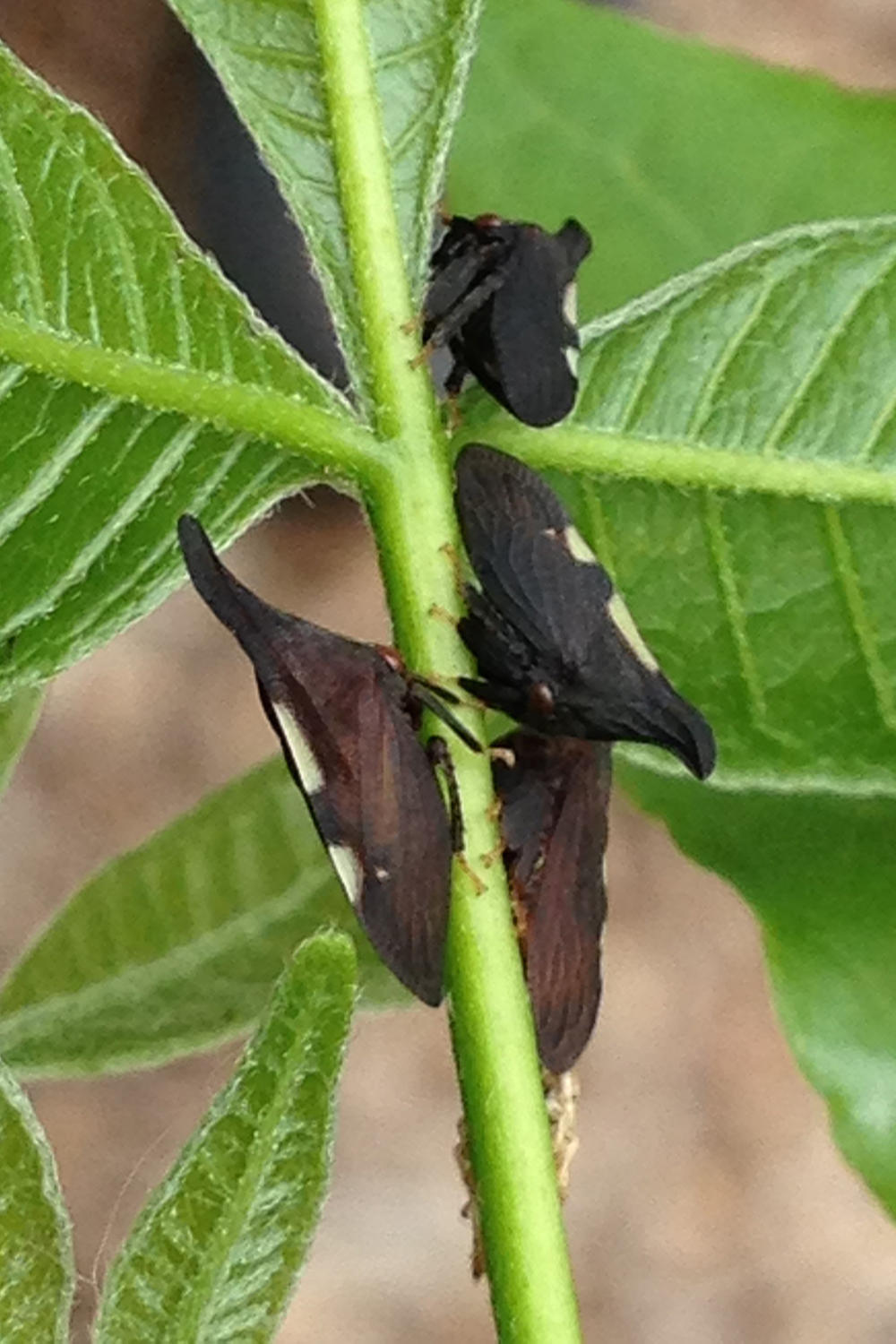
Adult E. binotata on wafer ash credit: Dr. Kasey Fowler-Finn

=== Vibrational communication ===
Male E. binotata 'Ptelea' treehopper from an Illinois population signaling at 24 °C

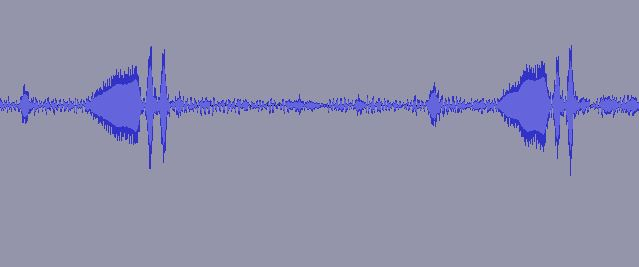
E. binotata male signal that contains 2 signals in 1 bout with 2 pulses each

Male E. binotata treehoppers make substrate-borne vibrations on the stems, petioles, and leaves of their host plants that travel throughout the plant. Females detect these vibrational signals with specialized structures on their legs and they also respond through the plant. Male signals are more complex than female responses. Male and female signals are tonal, but females respond with grunt-like sounds that are at a lower frequency than the males. Females have specific species preferences, and prefer signals that are close to these conspecific frequencies, but frequencies can change with temperature fluctuations. Despite these fluctuations, females are able to distinguish their own species. Females duet with the males to help the male locate the females. Substrate-borne vibrations are not unique to treehoppers, most insects (more than 90%) use substrate-borne vibrations to communicate within species and between species. There is a variety of ways insects can produce vibrations to communicate and even more variation in how they utilize vibrational communication (i.e. mating calls, cooperative foraging, or catching prey).

=== Mating behavior and reproduction ===
Males search for mates by flying from one plant to another. As they land, they produce advertisement signals and wait for females to respond. Different species in this clade are most divergent in the frequency (Hz) of their mating signals.

Males fly or hop from plant to plant looking for female aggregations. Females only mate once, while males mate multiples times. Soon after a female mates, she would start ovipositing eggs into the stem of the plant. Females have saw-like ovipositors that allow them to cut a slit into the plant stem and deposit her eggs. When the slits are filled up, she covers them with white secretions called egg froths. The egg froth protects the eggs from the elements, biotic and abiotic.

== Host-shifts and sympatric speciation ==
=== Assortative mating ===
Adult females mostly respond to conspecific signals. Females that are from a different host plant than the male rarely responds to the male's signals. If they do respond, there is even a lower chance of mating success.

Females have mating windows that conspecific males follow. This sort of reproductive isolation has contributed to the divergence of the clade. Males and females closer in age are more likely to form pre-copulatory and copulatory pairs. Larger time gaps between plant phenologies creates more disruption in the gene flow between sympatrically occurring species.

Females tend to stay in their natal plants and prefer to mate and lay their eggs on it, which is called philopatry. Eggs that were laid non-host plants have higher mortality due to different plant nutrition and the absence of native ants that nurture and protect nymphs.

=== Phenology ===
Life histories of this species vary according to the phenology of their host plants. These treehoppers lay their eggs on its host plant's branches, as well as spend their juvenile and adult life on one plant. Egg hatching of these treehoppers are tied into the sap flow of their host plants. After winter, flow of the plant's sap to their stems is the stimuli the eggs need to start hatching. Once they have hatched from the stems as nymphs, they molt until adulthood (final form). Males start signaling first a week after they reach adulthood. Females become reproductively receptive 1–2 weeks about the males. After reproducing, females stay on one plant and oviposit their eggs continuously until they expire or until the first frost hits. Males live shorter than females and usually die shortly after mating a number of times.

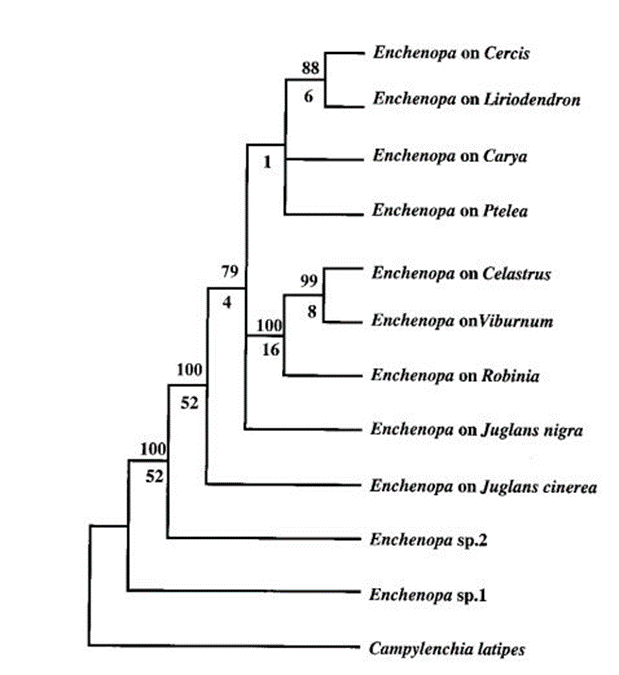
Proposed phylogenetic tree for Enchenopa

The complex has multiple species under the same name followed by the genus of its host plant (i.e. Enchenopa binotata 'Ptelea' for species that live in Ptelea trifoliata). The nutritional value of the host plant's sap could delay or boost adult maturation and egg hatching. Sap with more essential nutrients or more sap flow for the species can promote faster maturation and/or egg hatching. Species on different host plants have developed allochronic phenologies. This means that species on different host plants have evolved different timing in their life history.

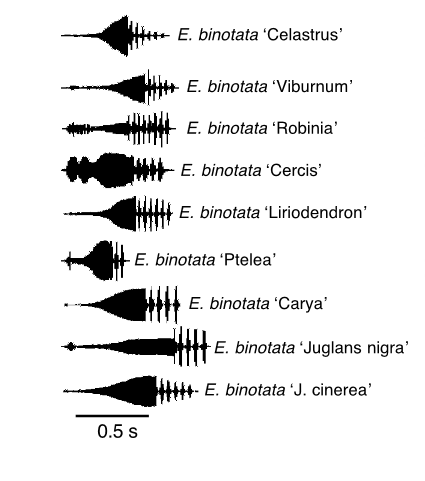
Male signals of the different species within the Enchenopa binotata complex

=== Phylogenetics ===
Phylogenetic data have shown that this species of Eastern North American treehoppers (E. binotata) diverged from two closely related species of Enchenopa from Central and South America. These two Enchenopa species are known to be polyphagous (feeds on multiple species of plants) as opposed to E. binotata that are monophagous (only feeds on one species of plants).

Male signal frequency is more heritable than female preference for certain frequencies. This means that there is more selection pressure on male signal frequency than female preference. Female choice might actually be the selection pressure that drove the divergence of male signal frequency in the E. binotata species complex.

== Host plants of species in the complex ==
- American bittersweet Celastrus scandens
- Black haw Viburnum prunifolium
- Black locust Robinia pseudoacacia
- Redbud Cercis canadensis
- Tulip tree Liriodendron tulipifera
- Shagbark hickory Carya ovata
- Wafer ash/hop tree Ptelea trifoliata
- Black walnut Juglans nigra
- Butternut Juglans cinerea
