= Antitrogus batesii =

Scientific classification
- Kingdom: Animalia
- Phylum: Arthropoda
- Clade: Pancrustacea
- Class: Insecta
- Order: Coleoptera
- Suborder: Polyphaga
- Infraorder: Scarabaeiformia
- Family: Scarabaeidae
- Tribe: Melolonthini
- Genus: Antitrogus
- Species: A. batesii

Binomial name
- Antitrogus batesii (Olliff, 1890)

Synonyms
- Othnonius batesii Olliff, 1890

Species of beetle

Antitrogus batesii, the blacksoil scarab, is a species of beetle of the family Scarabaeidae. It is found in Australia (New South Wales, Queensland).

== Description ==
Adults reach a length of about 14–17 mm (0.55–0.67 in). The head, pronotum and scutellum are black to dark reddish-brown, while the elytra are reddish-brown or yellowish-brown, the propygidium yellowish-brown, the pygidium brown to black and the ventral surface of the thorax and legs dark brown to black.
