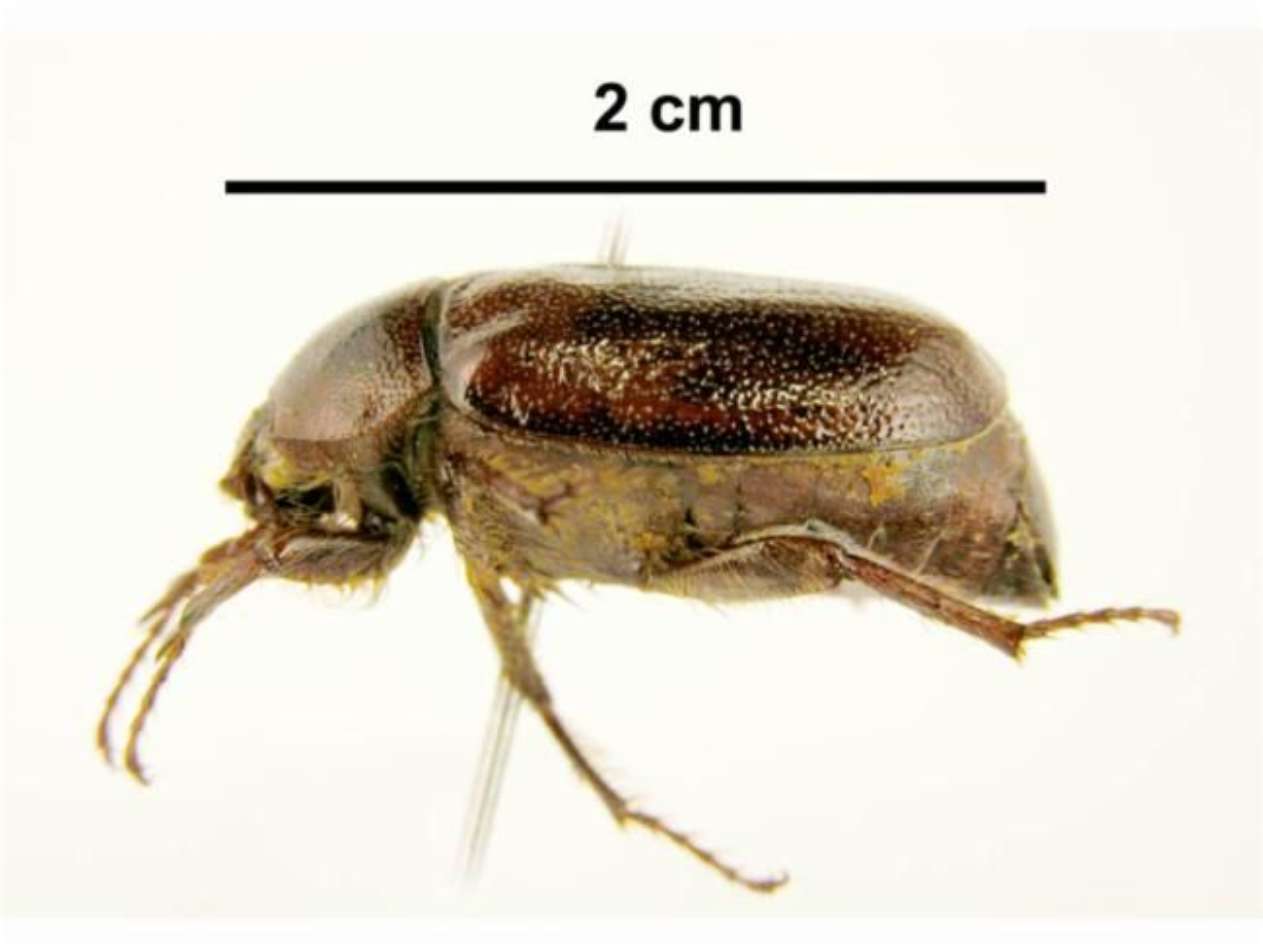

Scientific classification
- Kingdom: Animalia
- Phylum: Arthropoda
- Clade: Pancrustacea
- Class: Insecta
- Order: Coleoptera
- Suborder: Polyphaga
- Infraorder: Scarabaeiformia
- Family: Scarabaeidae
- Tribe: Melolonthini
- Genus: Antitrogus
- Species: A. planiceps

Binomial name
- Antitrogus planiceps (Blackburn, 1911)

Synonyms
- Rhopaea planiceps Blackburn, 1911

= Antitrogus planiceps =

Species of beetle

Antitrogus planiceps, the planiceps canegrub, is a species of beetle of the family Scarabaeidae. It is found in Australia (New South Wales and South Australia).

== Description ==
Adults reach a length of about 18–21 mm (0.71–0.83 in). The body and legs are uniform medium to dark reddish brown, while the antennae are brown with the lamellae paler.

== Life history ==
They are a minor pest of sugarcane. Adults have been recorded from October to December.
