= Antitrogus setifrons =

Scientific classification
- Kingdom: Animalia
- Phylum: Arthropoda
- Clade: Pancrustacea
- Class: Insecta
- Order: Coleoptera
- Suborder: Polyphaga
- Infraorder: Scarabaeiformia
- Family: Scarabaeidae
- Tribe: Melolonthini
- Genus: Antitrogus
- Species: A. setifrons

Binomial name
- Antitrogus setifrons Britton, 1979

Species of beetle

Antitrogus setifrons is a species of beetle of the family Scarabaeidae. It is found in Australia (central Queensland).

== Description ==
Adults reach a length of about 18–21 mm (0.71–0.83 in). The head, pronotum, scutellum, elytra and legs are reddish brown, with the pronotum and elytra mottled with dark brown marks. The venter is yellowish brown.

== Life history ==
The larvae are a minor pest of lawns. Adults have been recorded in November.
