= Meconopsis manasluensis =

Scientific classification
- Kingdom: Plantae
- Clade: Embryophytes
- Clade: Tracheophytes
- Clade: Spermatophytes
- Clade: Angiosperms
- Clade: Eudicots
- Order: Ranunculales
- Family: Papaveraceae
- Genus: Meconopsis
- Species: M. manasluensis

Binomial name
- Meconopsis manasluensis P.A.Egan

Species of flowering plant in the poppy family

Meconopsis manasluensis is a red-flowered Himalayan poppy belonging to Meconopsis subg. Discogyne, which forms a natural grouping of 6 or 7 species within the genus all characterised by a stylar disc surmounting the ovary (lacking in other Meconopsis). As reflected by the species etymology, M. manasluensis is endemic to the vicinity of the Manaslu Himal of Gorkha district, central Nepal, where it grows at high elevation (ca. 4000 m) and so far remains known only from its type collection locality.

Meconopsis manasluensis is easily distinguished within subgenus Discogyne through its multiple flowering stems, unlike the single prominent fleshy stem in all other species. The closely related M. pinnatifolia is known from the same general locality in the wild, however possible mechanisms preventing cross-fertilisation between M. manasluensis and this species remain unclear.

Specimens of M. manasluensis were first collected on the joint Royal Botanic Garden Edinburgh/University of Tokyo Manaslu '08 expedition to the Manaslu Eco-Tourism Area in 2008. It was not until later herbarium research undertaken for preparation of the Flora of Nepal that the specimens were discovered to constitute a new species, subsequently described in 2011 alongside Meconopsis autumnalis.

== Ecology ==
Meconopsis manasluensis is found growing in alpine scrub (Betula utilis, Berberis, Lonicera, Salix, etc.) and herb-rich alpine grasslands at elevations in and around 4,000 m (13,000 ft) in moist, humus-rich soils. The plant is locally abundant, but a small or possibly severely restricted specific distribution may give cause for conservational concern. Flowering is July–August.
