= Antitrogus =

Scientific classification
- Kingdom: Animalia
- Phylum: Arthropoda
- Clade: Pancrustacea
- Class: Insecta
- Order: Coleoptera
- Suborder: Polyphaga
- Infraorder: Scarabaeiformia
- Family: Scarabaeidae
- Subfamily: Melolonthinae
- Tribe: Melolonthini
- Genus: Antitrogus; Burmeister, 1855

Synonyms
- Othnonius Olliff, 1890

Genus of beetles

Antitrogus is a genus of beetles belonging to the family Scarabaeidae.

== Species ==
- Antitrogus adamsi Britton, 1978
- Antitrogus adustus Britton, 1978
- Antitrogus batesii (Olliff, 1890)
- Antitrogus brooksi Britton, 1978
- Antitrogus burmeisteri Blackburn, 1911
- Antitrogus carnei Britton, 1978
- Antitrogus ciliatus (Britton, 1978)
- Antitrogus circulifrons Britton, 1978
- Antitrogus consanguineus (Blackburn, 1911)
- Antitrogus costai Allsopp, 1993
- Antitrogus gubbi Allsopp, 2003
- Antitrogus morbillosus (Blackburn, 1898)
- Antitrogus mussoni (Blackburn, 1892)
- Antitrogus nox Britton, 1978
- Antitrogus parilis Britton, 1978
- Antitrogus parvulus Britton, 1978
- Antitrogus planiceps (Blackburn, 1911)
- Antitrogus politus (Lea, 1920)
- Antitrogus robertsi Britton, 1978
- Antitrogus rugulosus (Blackburn, 1911)
- Antitrogus setifer Britton, 1978
- Antitrogus setifrons Britton, 1979
- Antitrogus tasmanicus (Burmeister, 1855)
- Antitrogus tumidifrons Britton, 1978
- Antitrogus villosus Allsopp, 1993
