= Antitrogus parilis =

Scientific classification
- Kingdom: Animalia
- Phylum: Arthropoda
- Clade: Pancrustacea
- Class: Insecta
- Order: Coleoptera
- Suborder: Polyphaga
- Infraorder: Scarabaeiformia
- Family: Scarabaeidae
- Tribe: Melolonthini
- Genus: Antitrogus
- Species: A. parilis

Binomial name
- Antitrogus parilis Britton, 1978

Species of beetle

Antitrogus parilis is a species of beetle of the family Scarabaeidae. It is found in Australia (Queensland, New South Wales).

== Description ==
Adults reach a length of about 21–25 mm (0.83–0.98 in). They are reddish brown to darker brown, with the frons, disc of the pronotum and the scutellum darker than the clypeus, the lateral margins of the pronotum and the elytra.

== Life history ==
Adults have been recorded from November to January.
