= Antitrogus villosus =

Scientific classification
- Kingdom: Animalia
- Phylum: Arthropoda
- Clade: Pancrustacea
- Class: Insecta
- Order: Coleoptera
- Suborder: Polyphaga
- Infraorder: Scarabaeiformia
- Family: Scarabaeidae
- Tribe: Melolonthini
- Genus: Antitrogus
- Species: A. villosus

Binomial name
- Antitrogus villosus Allsopp, 1993

Species of beetle

Antitrogus villosus is a species of beetle of the family Scarabaeidae. It is found in Australia (central-western Victoria).

== Description ==
Adults reach a length of about 15.5–16.5 mm (0.61–0.65 in). The head, pronotum (mottled with dark brown), scutellum, pygidium and venter are brown, while the elytra are dark brown to more reddish brown near the lateral margins.

== Life history ==
Adults have been recorded in November.
