= Antitrogus tasmanicus =

Scientific classification
- Kingdom: Animalia
- Phylum: Arthropoda
- Clade: Pancrustacea
- Class: Insecta
- Order: Coleoptera
- Suborder: Polyphaga
- Infraorder: Scarabaeiformia
- Family: Scarabaeidae
- Tribe: Melolonthini
- Genus: Antitrogus
- Species: A. tasmanicus

Binomial name
- Antitrogus tasmanicus (Burmeister, 1855)

Synonyms
- Rhizotrogus tasmanicus Burmeister, 1855; Antitrogus nigricornis Blackburn, 1911

Species of beetle

Antitrogus tasmanicus is a species of beetle of the family Scarabaeidae. It is found in Australia (northern Tasmania, southern and central Victoria).

== Description ==
Adults reach a length of about 19–24 mm (0.75–0.94 in). The head, pronotum and elytra are dark reddish brown or black, sometimes reddish at the margins, while the antennae and palpi are reddish brown or dark brown. The legs are reddish brown to very dark brown.

== Life history ==
Adults have been recorded from October to November.
