= Antitrogus ciliatus =

Scientific classification
- Kingdom: Animalia
- Phylum: Arthropoda
- Clade: Pancrustacea
- Class: Insecta
- Order: Coleoptera
- Suborder: Polyphaga
- Infraorder: Scarabaeiformia
- Family: Scarabaeidae
- Tribe: Melolonthini
- Genus: Antitrogus
- Species: A. ciliatus

Binomial name
- Antitrogus ciliatus (Britton, 1978)

Synonyms
- Lepidiota ciliata Britton, 1978

Species of beetle

Antitrogus ciliatus is a species of beetle of the family Scarabaeidae. It is found in Australia (north-eastern New South Wales).

== Description ==
Adults reach a length of about 21–23 mm (0.83–0.91 in). They are uniformly bright reddish-brown.

== Life history ==
Adults have been recorded in late November.
