= Antitrogus burmeisteri =

Scientific classification
- Kingdom: Animalia
- Phylum: Arthropoda
- Clade: Pancrustacea
- Class: Insecta
- Order: Coleoptera
- Suborder: Polyphaga
- Infraorder: Scarabaeiformia
- Family: Scarabaeidae
- Tribe: Melolonthini
- Genus: Antitrogus
- Species: A. burmeisteri

Binomial name
- Antitrogus burmeisteri Blackburn, 1911

Species of beetle

Antitrogus burmeisteri is a species of beetle of the family Scarabaeidae. It is found in Australia (south-eastern South Australia, western Victoria).

== Description ==
Adults reach a length of about 20–23 mm (0.79–0.91 in). They are dark reddish brown to black, while the abdomen and legs are reddish brown and the antennae reddish brown to dark brown. The pronotum has punctures, with each puncture bearing a minute hair. On the elytra, some scattered punctures bear longer white setae.

== Life history ==
Adults have been collected from September to November, from February to March and in May.
