= Antitrogus brooksi =

Scientific classification
- Kingdom: Animalia
- Phylum: Arthropoda
- Clade: Pancrustacea
- Class: Insecta
- Order: Coleoptera
- Suborder: Polyphaga
- Infraorder: Scarabaeiformia
- Family: Scarabaeidae
- Tribe: Melolonthini
- Genus: Antitrogus
- Species: A. brooksi

Binomial name
- Antitrogus brooksi Britton, 1978

Species of beetle

Antitrogus brooksi is a species of beetle of the family Scarabaeidae. It is found in Australia (Queensland).

== Description ==
Adults reach a length of about 19–24 mm (0.75–0.94 in). The head is dark brown, but reddish along the margin of the clypeus and near the eyes. The pronotum and scutellum are reddish yellow (the former mottled with brown). The elytra, pygidium, ventral surface and legs are yellowish brown.

== Life history ==
Adults have been recorded in January.
