= Antitrogus adustus =

Scientific classification
- Kingdom: Animalia
- Phylum: Arthropoda
- Clade: Pancrustacea
- Class: Insecta
- Order: Coleoptera
- Suborder: Polyphaga
- Infraorder: Scarabaeiformia
- Family: Scarabaeidae
- Tribe: Melolonthini
- Genus: Antitrogus
- Species: A. adustus

Binomial name
- Antitrogus adustus Britton, 1978

Species of beetle

Antitrogus adustus is a species of beetle of the family Scarabaeidae. It is found in Australia (south-eastern Queensland, north-eastern New South Wales).

== Description ==
Adults reach a length of about 18–22 mm (0.71–0.87 in). The clypeus is dark reddish brown, while the frons and disc of the pronotum are black, and the pronotum itself dark reddish brown at the lateral margins. The scutellum and elytra are dark reddish brown or black. The latter has a dull, pruinose surface, while the surface of the pronotum and scutellum is shining and darker. White setae are found on the pronotum and elytra.

== Life history ==
Adults have been collected from November to December.
