= Antitrogus gubbi =

Scientific classification
- Kingdom: Animalia
- Phylum: Arthropoda
- Clade: Pancrustacea
- Class: Insecta
- Order: Coleoptera
- Suborder: Polyphaga
- Infraorder: Scarabaeiformia
- Family: Scarabaeidae
- Tribe: Melolonthini
- Genus: Antitrogus
- Species: A. gubbi

Binomial name
- Antitrogus gubbi Allsopp, 2003

Species of beetle

Antitrogus gubbi is a species of beetle of the family Scarabaeidae. It is found in Australia (Queensland).

== Description ==
Adults reach a length of about 21–26 mm (0.83–1.02 in). The head, pronotum, scutellum, elytra and pygidium are dark brown with a sericeous bloom, while the elytra are paler. The antennae, venter and legs are reddish-brown to dark brown.

== Etymology ==
The species name honours the Gubbi Gubbi people who live in the same area as this species.
