= Antitrogus consanguineus =

Scientific classification
- Kingdom: Animalia
- Phylum: Arthropoda
- Clade: Pancrustacea
- Class: Insecta
- Order: Coleoptera
- Suborder: Polyphaga
- Infraorder: Scarabaeiformia
- Family: Scarabaeidae
- Tribe: Melolonthini
- Genus: Antitrogus
- Species: A. consanguineus

Binomial name
- Antitrogus consanguineus (Blackburn, 1911)

Synonyms
- Rhopaea consanginea Blackburn, 1911

Species of beetle

Antitrogus consanguineus is a species of beetle of the family Scarabaeidae. It is found in Australia (Queensland).

== Description ==
Adults reach a length of about 20–25 mm (0.79–0.98 in). They are yellowish brown to bright reddish brown.

== Life history ==
The larvae are a pest of sugarcane, destroying the roots of their host plant. Adults have been recorded from September to October.
