= Antitrogus mussoni =

Scientific classification
- Kingdom: Animalia
- Phylum: Arthropoda
- Clade: Pancrustacea
- Class: Insecta
- Order: Coleoptera
- Suborder: Polyphaga
- Infraorder: Scarabaeiformia
- Family: Scarabaeidae
- Tribe: Melolonthini
- Genus: Antitrogus
- Species: A. mussoni

Binomial name
- Antitrogus mussoni (Blackburn, 1892)

Synonyms
- Rhopaea mussoni Blackburn, 1892; Rhopaea dubitans Blackburn, 1911

Species of beetle

Antitrogus mussoni, the canegrub, is a species of beetle of the family Scarabaeidae. It is found in Australia (northern New South Wales, southern Queensland).

== Description ==
Adults reach a length of about 20–25 mm (0.79–0.98 in). They are bright reddish brown, with the frons and the disc of the pronotum sometimes darker.

== Life history ==
Adults have been recorded from December to January.
