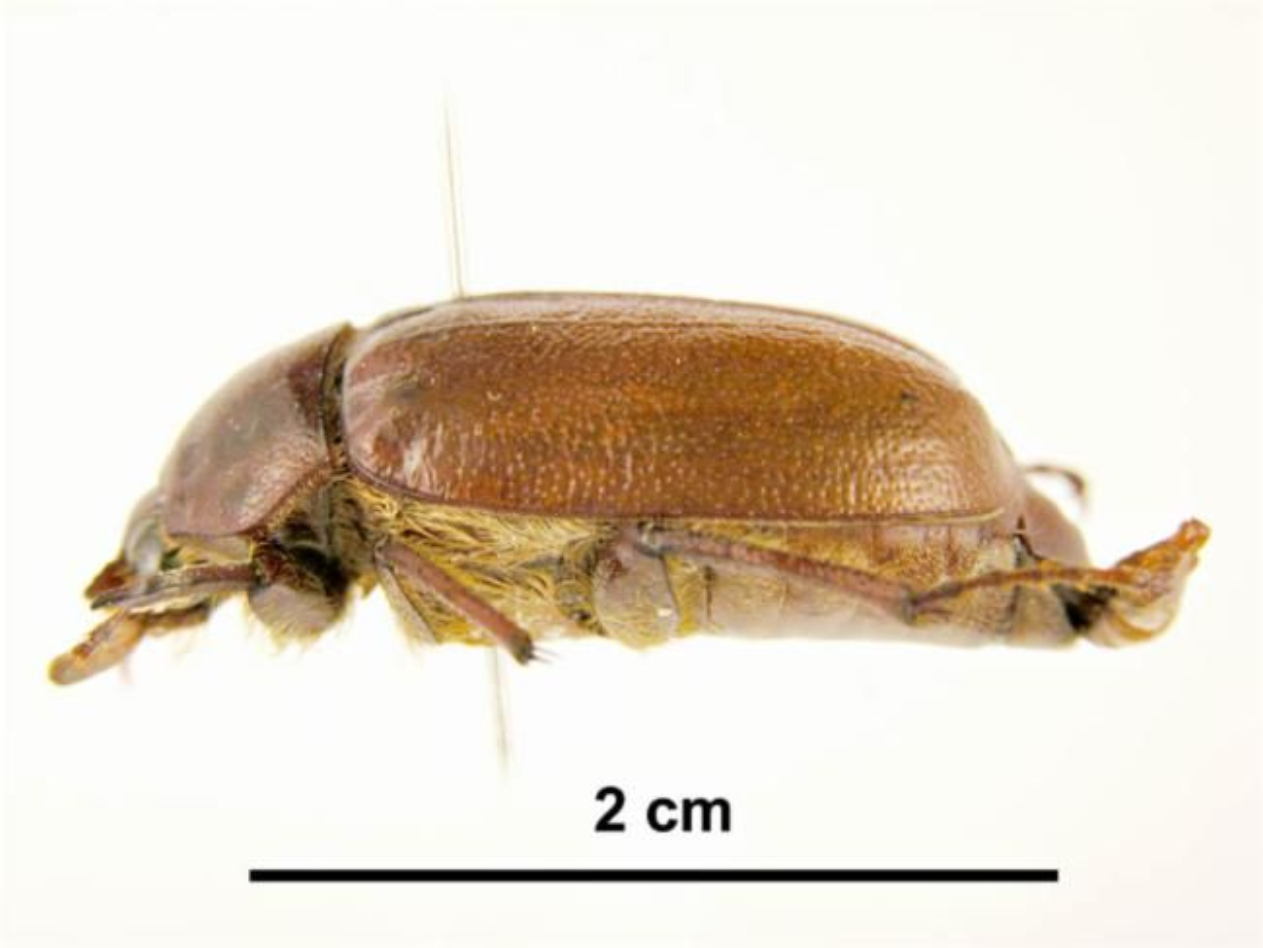

Scientific classification
- Kingdom: Animalia
- Phylum: Arthropoda
- Clade: Pancrustacea
- Class: Insecta
- Order: Coleoptera
- Suborder: Polyphaga
- Infraorder: Scarabaeiformia
- Family: Scarabaeidae
- Tribe: Melolonthini
- Genus: Antitrogus
- Species: A. rugulosus

Binomial name
- Antitrogus rugulosus (Blackburn, 1911)

Synonyms
- Rhopaea rugulosa Blackburn, 1911

= Antitrogus rugulosus =

Species of beetle

Antitrogus rugulosus, the Nambour canegrub, is a species of beetle of the family Scarabaeidae. It is found in Australia (from south-eastern Queensland to north-eastern New South Wales).

== Description ==
Adults reach a length of about 20–25 mm (0.79–0.98 in). They are yellowish brown to reddish brown.

== Life history ==
They are a pest of sugarcane and a minor pest of pineapples. Adults have been recorded from October to November.
