= Meconopsis autumnalis =

Scientific classification
- Kingdom: Plantae
- Clade: Embryophytes
- Clade: Tracheophytes
- Clade: Spermatophytes
- Clade: Angiosperms
- Clade: Eudicots
- Order: Ranunculales
- Family: Papaveraceae
- Genus: Meconopsis
- Species: M. autumnalis

Binomial name
- Meconopsis autumnalis P.A.Egan

Species of flowering plant in the poppy family

Meconopsis autumnalis, the Nepalese autumn poppy, is a yellow-flowered Himalayan poppy belonging to series Robustae, and is endemic to the Ganesh Himal range of central Nepal, where it was discovered in 2008 on a research expedition from the University of Aberdeen. In addition to several morphological features, the species is characterised by its late flowering period (as reflected in the specific etymology), which has more than likely resulted in a barrier to gene flow and subsequent evolutionary divergence from the closely related and sympatric species Meconopsis paniculata. The leaves (laminae) are hairy, pinnatisect and 35–55 cm (14–22 in) long and 8–16 cm (3.1–6.3 in) wide, with a petiole 11–25 cm (rarely 31 cm) long. The flowers are pale yellow with four (rarely six) petals each 4.3–5.6 cm long by 4.1–5.5 cm wide.

Specimens of M. autumnalis had twice previously been collected, by famous plant hunter J. D. A. Stainton on his 1962 expedition with S. A. Bowes Lyon to central Nepal, and on the Flora of Ganesh Himal expedition undertaken by the University of Tokyo in 1994. However, despite recognition as to the novelty of the plant implicated in Stainon's fieldnotes accompanying the species paratype (where it was described as 'easily distinguishable' from M. paniculata), it was not until new collections and field observations in 2008 that the true status of the plant as a new species was definitely realised. It was formally described in 2011.

== Ecology ==
Meconopsis autumnalis grows in sub-alpine habitat commonly along stream margins, grassy alpine slopes or at edges and openings of Abies forest. Commonly associated herbaceous species include Rumex, Arisaema, Stellaria, Nepeta, Persicaria, Aster, Swertia, as well as dwarf shrubs such as Berberis, Rhododendron and Juniperus. The species ranges in elevation from 3,300 to 4,200 m (10,800 to 13,800 ft), favouring stony, humus-rich soils. As with Meconopsis manasluensis and other Meconopsis of Nepal, the species appears to exhibit a very limited geographic distribution, thus necessitating more in-depth conservation assessment. Flowering occurs in late July to September.
