= Antitrogus parvulus =

Scientific classification
- Kingdom: Animalia
- Phylum: Arthropoda
- Clade: Pancrustacea
- Class: Insecta
- Order: Coleoptera
- Suborder: Polyphaga
- Infraorder: Scarabaeiformia
- Family: Scarabaeidae
- Tribe: Melolonthini
- Genus: Antitrogus
- Species: A. parvulus

Binomial name
- Antitrogus parvulus Britton, 1978

Species of beetle

Antitrogus parvulus, Childers canegrub, is a species of beetle of the family Scarabaeidae. It is found in Australia (southern coastal Queensland).

== Description ==
Adults reach a length of about 18–23 mm (0.71–0.91 in). They are yellowish brown or black.

== Life history ==
They are a major pest of sugarcane, with the larvae destroying the roots of their host plant.
