= Antitrogus robertsi =

Scientific classification
- Kingdom: Animalia
- Phylum: Arthropoda
- Clade: Pancrustacea
- Class: Insecta
- Order: Coleoptera
- Suborder: Polyphaga
- Infraorder: Scarabaeiformia
- Family: Scarabaeidae
- Tribe: Melolonthini
- Genus: Antitrogus
- Species: A. robertsi

Binomial name
- Antitrogus robertsi Britton, 1978

Species of beetle

Antitrogus robertsi is a species of beetle of the family Scarabaeidae. It is found in Australia (northern New South Wales).

== Description ==
Adults reach a length of about 19–22 mm (0.75–0.87 in). The body and legs are fairly uniformly bright reddish brown, but sometimes dark brown, with a sericeous bloom. The antennal lamellae are pale yellowish brown, while the remainder of the antennae and palpi are brown.
