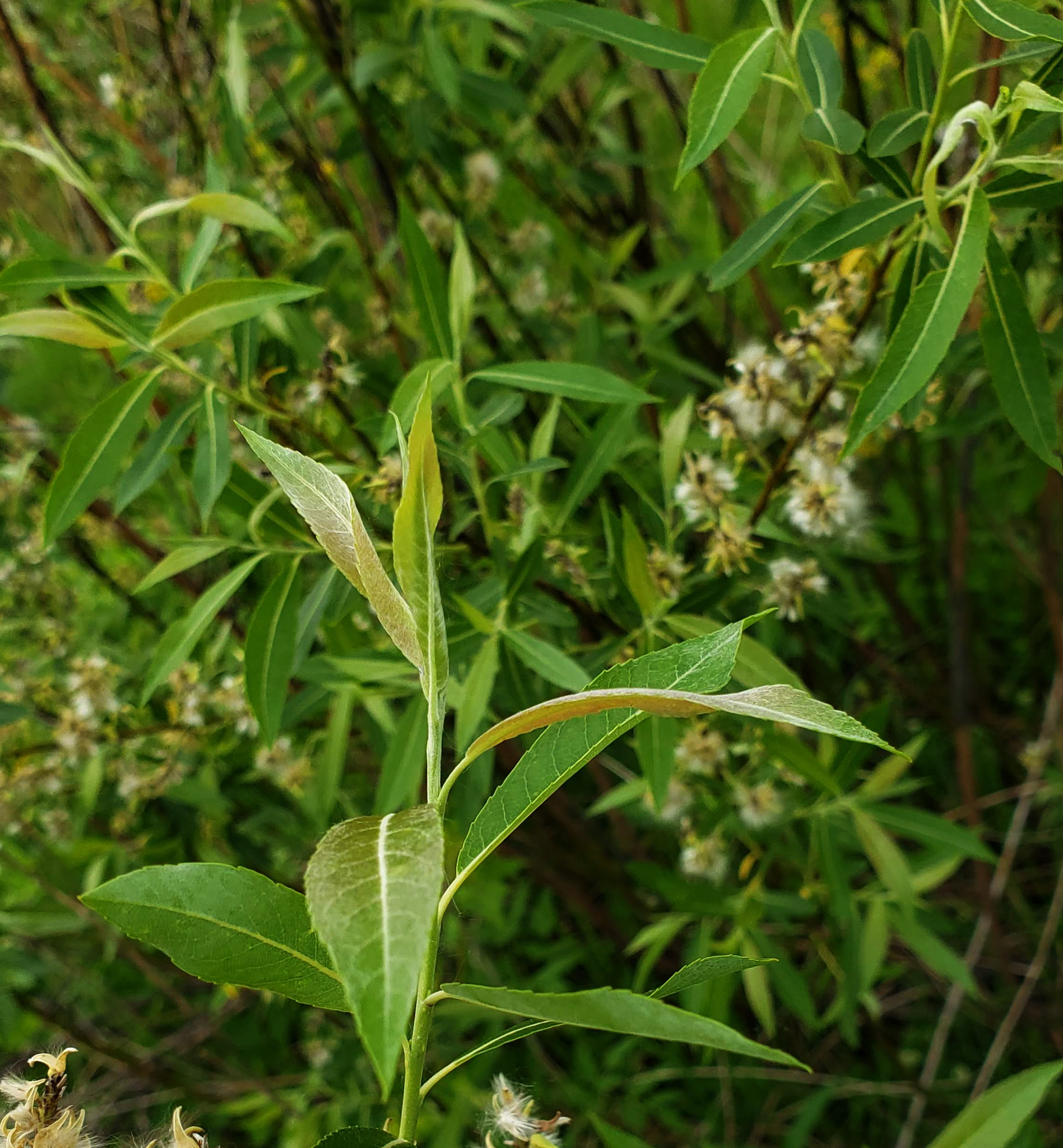

Conservation status
- Least Concern (IUCN 3.1)

Scientific classification
- Kingdom: Plantae
- Clade: Tracheophytes
- Clade: Angiosperms
- Clade: Eudicots
- Clade: Rosids
- Order: Malpighiales
- Family: Salicaceae
- Genus: Salix
- Species: S. petiolaris

Binomial name
- Salix petiolaris Sm.

= Salix petiolaris =

Species of willow

Salix petiolaris, common name slender willow or meadow willow, is a species of willow.

== Conservation status in the United States ==
It is listed as a species of special concern in Connecticut by state authorities. It is also listed as threatened in Ohio, and endangered in Pennsylvania.
