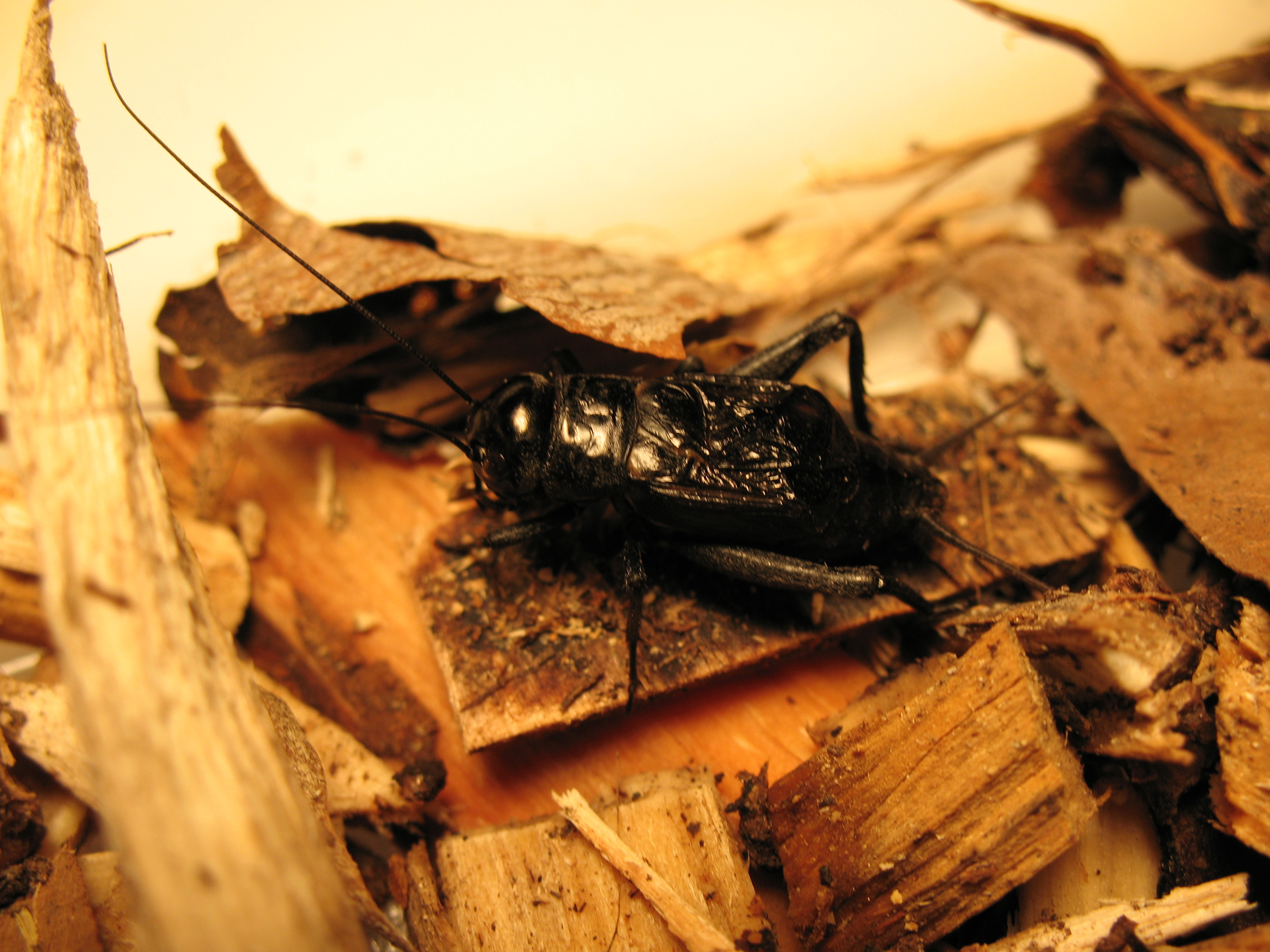
- A male Gryllus pennsylvanicus

Scientific classification
- Kingdom: Animalia
- Phylum: Arthropoda
- Clade: Pancrustacea
- Class: Insecta
- Order: Orthoptera
- Suborder: Ensifera
- Family: Gryllidae
- Genus: Gryllus
- Species: G. pennsylvanicus

Binomial name
- Gryllus pennsylvanicus Burmeister, 1838
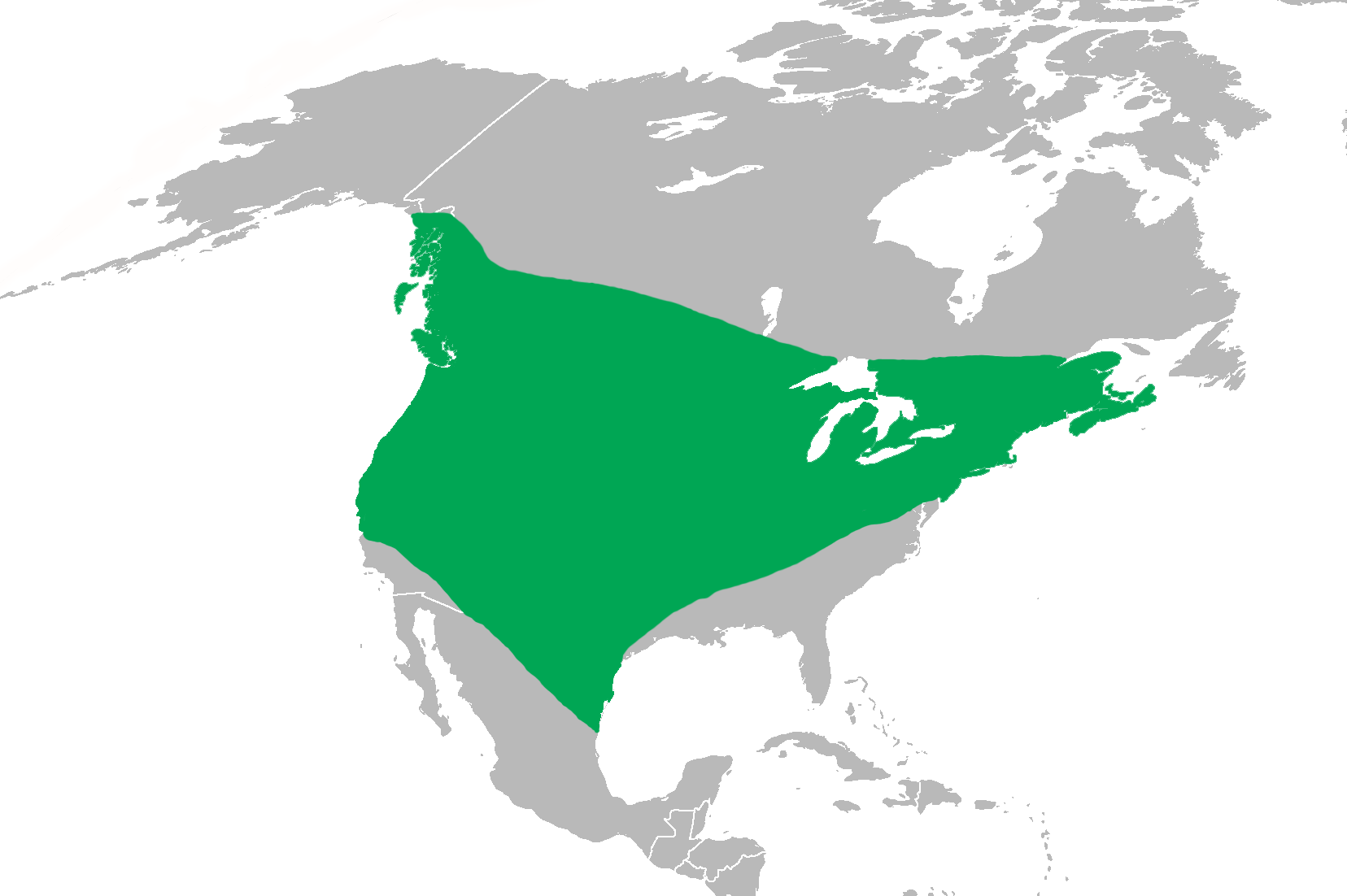

Synonyms
- G. abbreviatus Serville, 1838; G. angustus Scudder, 1863; G. arenaceus Blatchley, 1903; G. luctuosus Serville, 1838

= Gryllus pennsylvanicus =

Species of cricket

Gryllus pennsylvanicus is known as the fall field cricket. G. pennsylvanicus is widespread across much of North America from southern Ontario into parts of northern Mexico. It tends to be absent in most of the southwestern United States including southern California. Within its geographic range this field cricket will burrow into soil in fields and forest edges. Individuals inhabit grassy disturbed areas and are often found around areas of human habitation.

== Identification ==
Adults reach 15–25 millimetres (0.6–1.0 in) and coloration ranges from dark black to dark brown, although some specimens show a slight reddish tint. The black antennae tend to be longer than the body length of the species. The cerci are longer than the head and prothorax, and the wings do not extend past the cerci.

== Life cycle ==
During the breeding season, the number of adult female G. pennsylvanicus captured in pitfall traps peaks approximately two weeks after the peak in the number of adult males captured, which seems to indicate protandry. Breeding in some areas also coincides with the seed rain from certain agricultural weeds, possibly providing females with food resources to increase their fecundity. Males call from the mouths of burrows or cracks in the ground into which they escape when scared. Calling males are separated from each other by approximately 7.7 to 10.3 m in the field, likely making it costly for females to sample large numbers of potential mates. Male G. pennsylvanicus calling song consists of short chirps – roughly two to three per second – each consisting of three to five pulses (each a single closure of the male forewings or tegmina).

The calling song of Gryllus pennsylvanicus

Like most other gryllines, females are attracted to male calling song and are attracted to higher calling effort at least when population density is low. In an elegant series of field experiments, Zuk showed that female G. pennsylvanicus were more attracted to calling song produced by older males than that of younger males. Males found paired with females in the field were also older than unpaired calling males nearby. However, in the earlier experiment higher calling effort explained a small, but statistically significant proportion of the variance in female attraction, raising the possibility that the apparent preference of females for the songs of older males might be due to differences in calling effort between older and younger males.

Adults are mostly active during night when the males sing to attract females. Females will then lay their eggs by injecting their ovipositor into soil. A single female will lay around 50 eggs at a time and can lay well over 400 eggs in her life span. Eggs laid in the late summer and fall seasons will overwinter and hatch the following spring. There is one generation per year. Sometimes as winter approaches adults will find their way into houses where they will try to overwinter.

== Life history evolution ==
Because the only reliable method of distinguishing G. pennsylvanicus and G. veletis is based on the timing of their life history, Alexander and Bigelow proposed that G. veletis and G. pennsylvanicus were sister species and had diverged through a process of allochronic speciation, whereby a temporal separation between the breeding seasons of the two incipient species restricts gene flow. However, G. veletis and G. pennsylvanicus are not sister taxa; instead, G. pennsylvanicus form a well-supported clade with G. ovisopis and G. firmus, the latter of which forms an extensive hybrid zone with G. pennsylvanicus in the eastern United States. Currently, a major molecular phylogenetic revision of North American Gryllinae is underway (D. Gray, pers. comm.) that will include the approximately 20 western species as well as eastern species left out of earlier phylogenies (e.g. G. vernalis). This greatly anticipated work will undoubtedly provide ample diversity fodder for research into the evolution of life histories.

== Diet ==
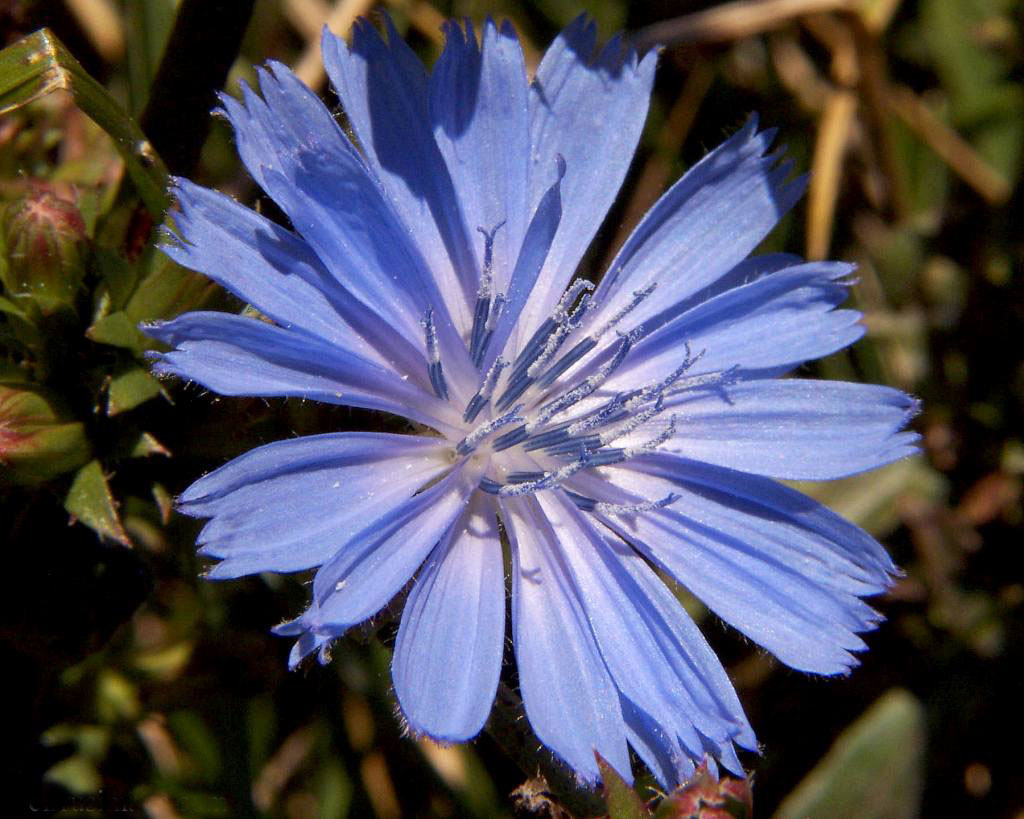
Cichorium intybus: a food source for G. pennsylvanicus

G. pennsylvanicus is an omnivorous organism and has been shown to be a significant predator of both seeds and invertebrates. The broad diet of G. pennsylvanicus, coupled with seasonal variation in the availability of different types of prey (plant or animal) could exert substantial diversifying selection on cricket life histories (i.e. the genotypes that are optimal in high seed abundance years are likely different from those that are most fit in years of high invertebrate prey – genotype by environment interactions).

Recorded food plants of G. pennsylvanicus include smooth crabgrass (Digitaria ischaemum), lamb's quarters (Chenopodium album), English plantain (Plantago lanceolata), switchgrass (Panicum virgatum), common ragweed (Ambrosia artemisiifolia) and chicory (Cichorium intybus). Even though they are a sizable cricket for North America they are preyed upon by everything from hawks to hornets.

== Model system ==
Gryllus pennsylvanicus is a model system for studying the effects of age on male reproductive success.

== Gallery ==
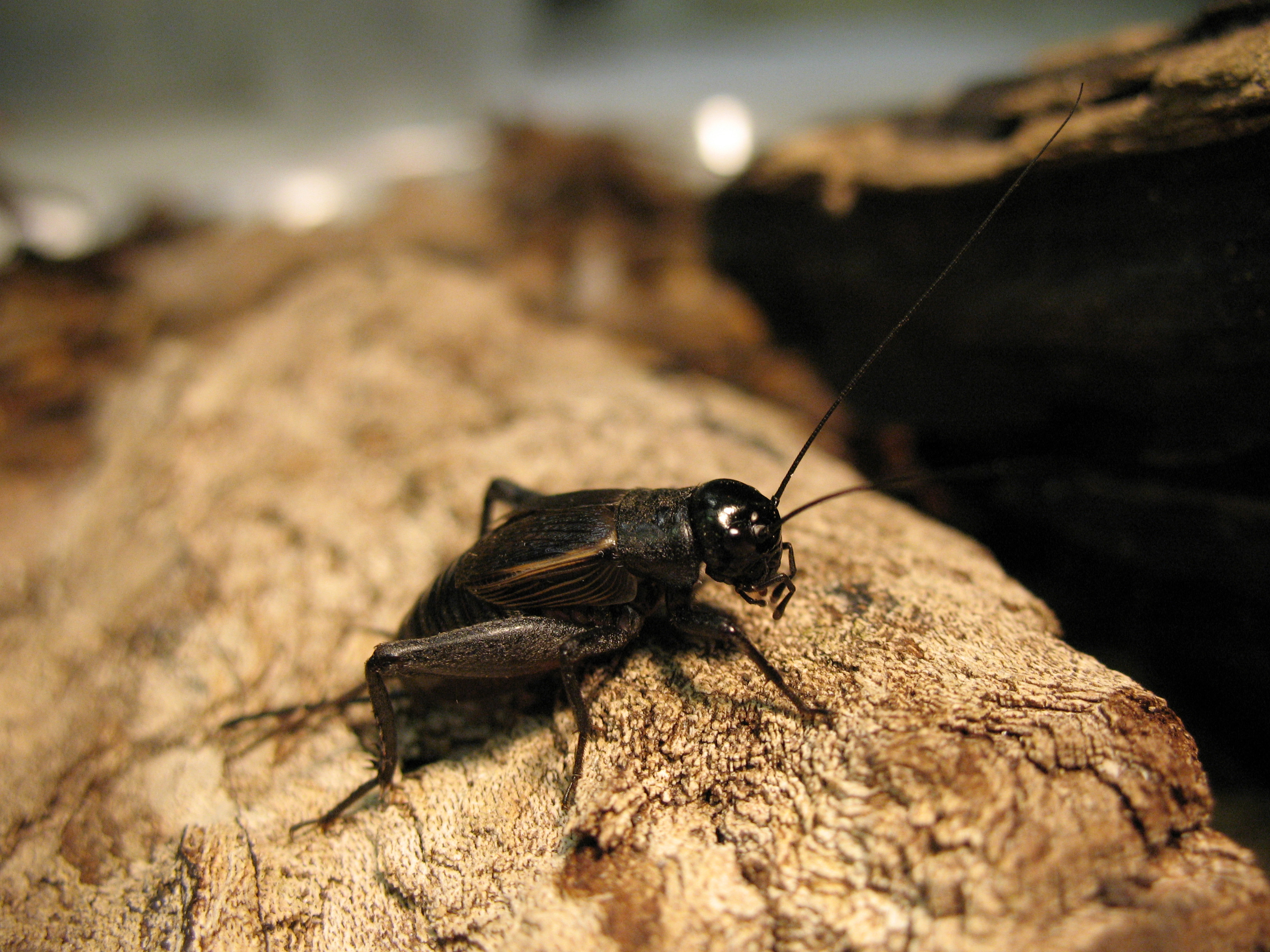
A female fall field cricket, Gryllus pennsylvanicus

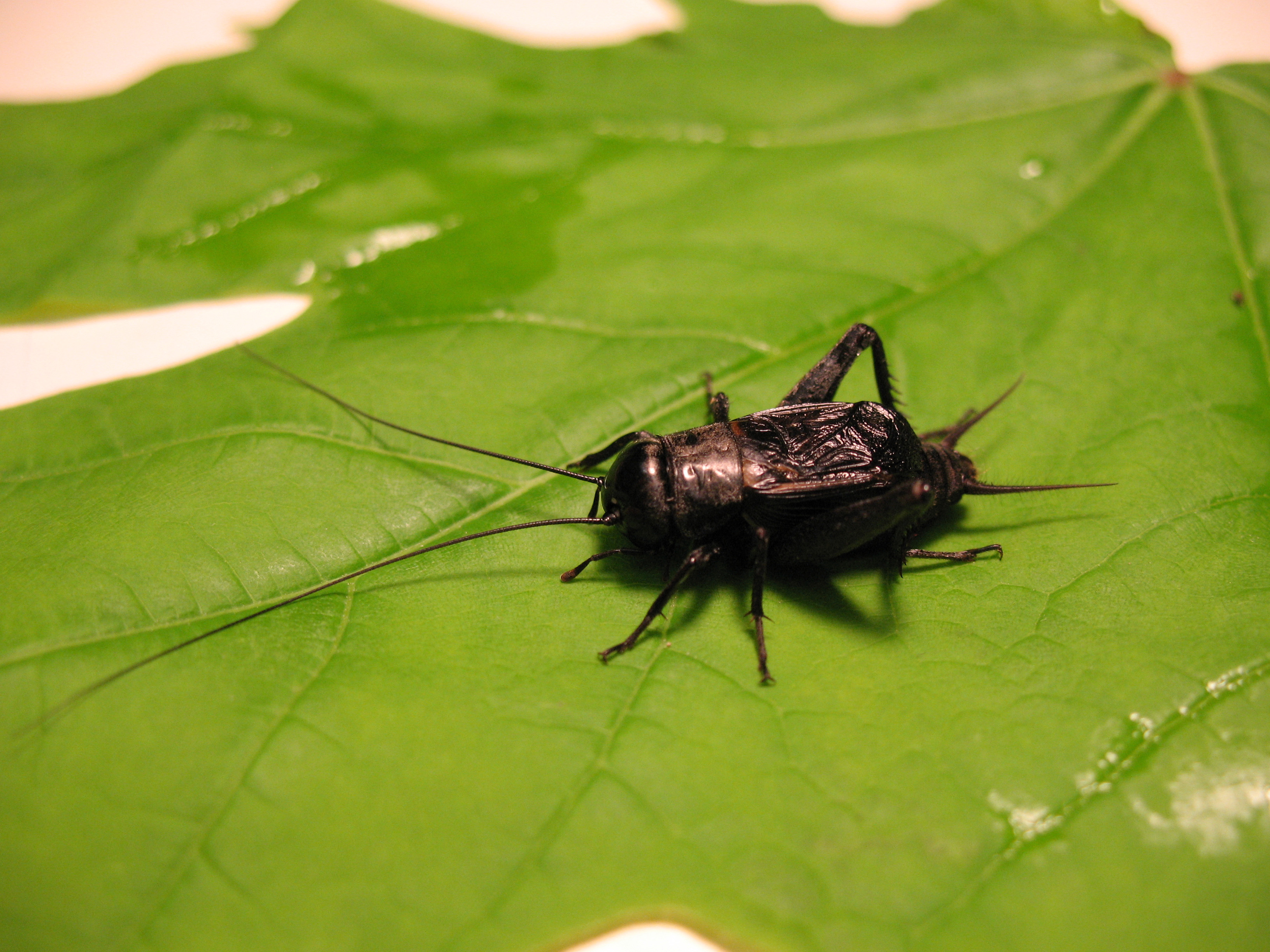
A male fall field cricket, Gryllus pennsylvanicus

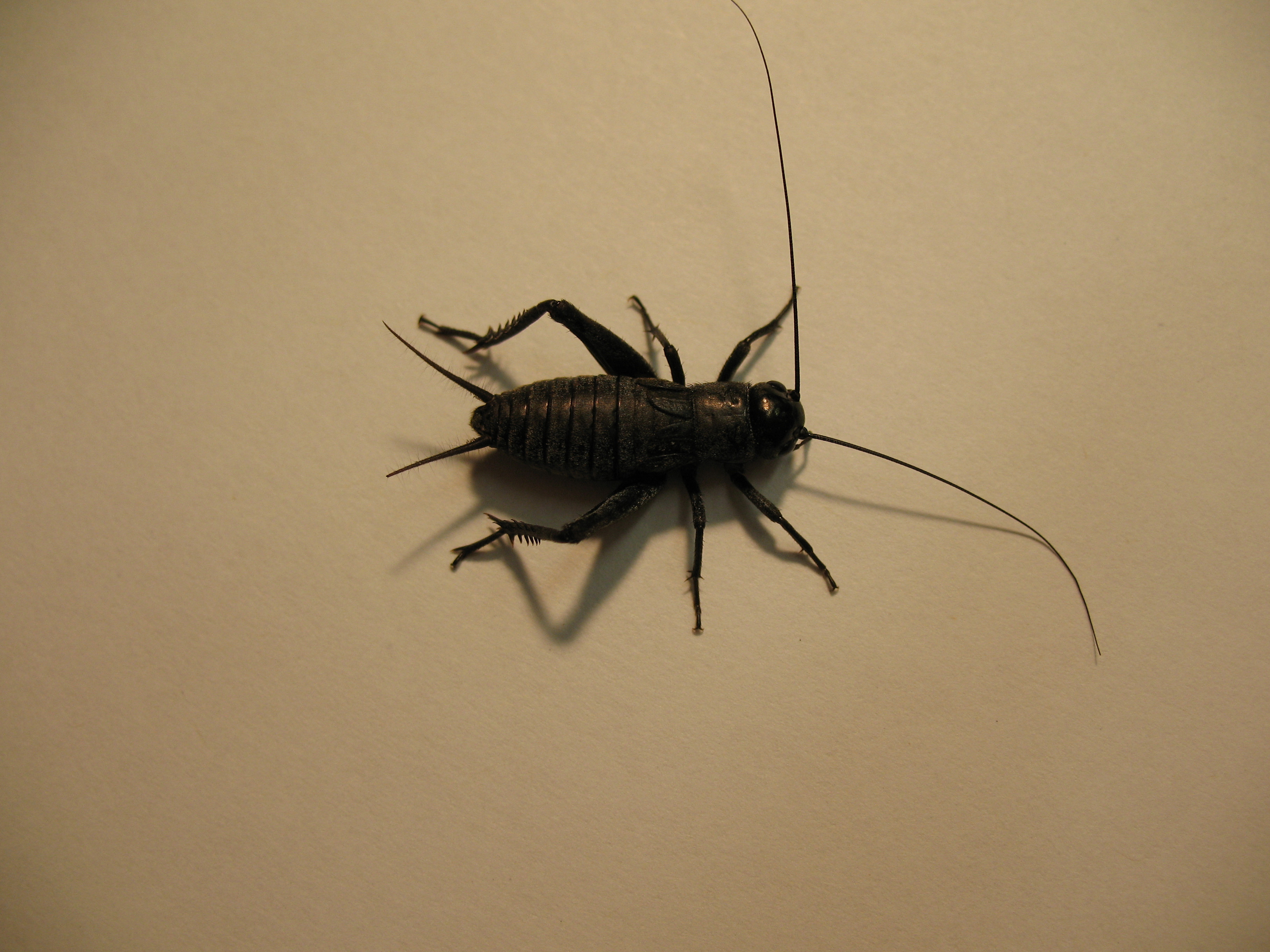
A nymphal male fall field cricket, Gryllus pennsylvanicus

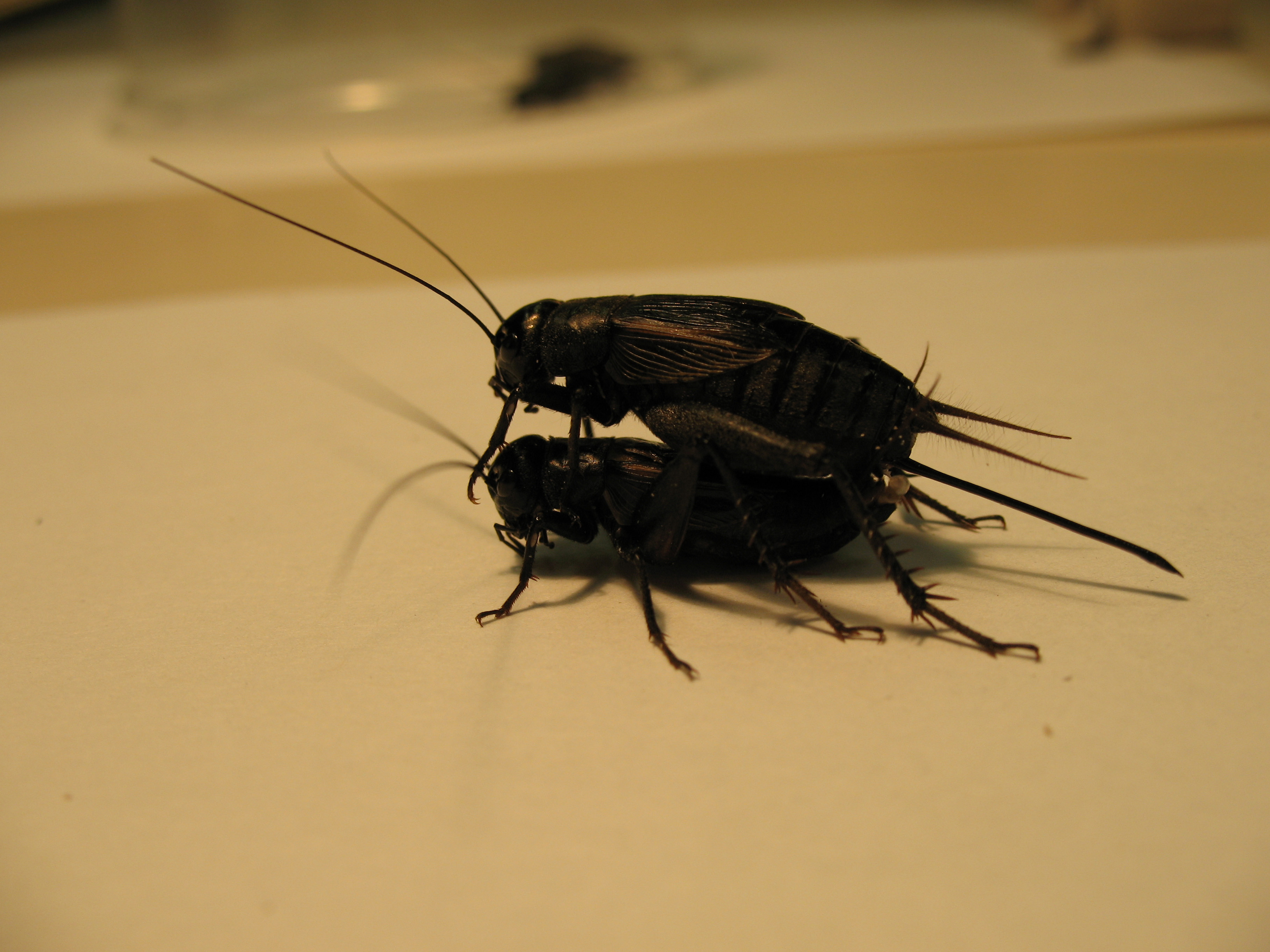
A pair of fall field crickets, Gryllus pennsylvanicus, mating
