= Polyphylla starkae =

Conservation status
- Critically Imperiled (NatureServe)

Scientific classification
- Kingdom: Animalia
- Phylum: Arthropoda
- Class: Insecta
- Order: Coleoptera
- Suborder: Polyphaga
- Infraorder: Scarabaeiformia
- Family: Scarabaeidae
- Genus: Polyphylla
- Species: P. starkae

Binomial name
- Polyphylla starkae Skelley, 2009

Species of beetle

Polyphylla starkae, commonly known as the Auburndale scrub scarab beetle, is a species of beetle in the family Scarabaeidae endemic to the U.S. state of Florida.

== Taxonomy ==
Polyphylla starkae is part of the pubescens species complex which includes P. pubescens, P. donaldsoni, and P. woodruffi all endemic to sand dunes in the Southeastern United States. P. starkae is the largest member in the complex, and shows significant sexual dimorphism between the males and females. Females have a reddish-brown elytra and body, with the elytra connected at its base making them flightless. Males have a typically dark elytra patchily covered with light brown coloured setae, and are also capable of flight. Its binomial name is an honorific for Donna Stark, who collected the beetle. Its common name comes from the city of Auburndale, Florida which is located near to its range.

== Distribution ==
The Auburndale scrub scarab is endemic to the Lake Wales Ridge in Central Florida, where it is found in a very limited range, requiring very specific scrub habitat.
