= Polyphylla woodruffi =

Conservation status
- Critically Imperiled (NatureServe)

Scientific classification
- Kingdom: Animalia
- Phylum: Arthropoda
- Class: Insecta
- Order: Coleoptera
- Suborder: Polyphaga
- Infraorder: Scarabaeiformia
- Family: Scarabaeidae
- Genus: Polyphylla
- Species: P. woodruffi

Binomial name
- Polyphylla woodruffi Skelley, 2003

Species of beetle

Polyphylla woodruffi, commonly known as Woodruff's polyphyllan scarab beetle, is a species of beetle in the family Scarabaeidae endemic to the U.S. state of Florida. It is found in the Florida panhandle in coastal dune habitat in Gulf and Walton counties.

== Taxonomy ==
Polyphylla woodruffi is part of the pubescens species complex which includes P. pubescens, P. donaldsoni, and P. starkae all endemic to sand dunes in the Southeastern United States.

== Description ==
Similar to other species in the pubescens species complex but differing slightly. The mesotibia has a small, bump-like tooth halfway along the outer edge, with bristles closer to the base. The metatibia is thick and spreads outward most of its length, and is clearly wider at the tip than the width of the third abdominal segment. The inner edge of this tibia is straight, not curved at the end. The hind leg is lighter in color than the pronotum. Its tarsi have teeth on their back claws that are half as long as the teeth on the front claws. The parameres are about three and a half times longer than their width at the base. The scutellum is covered in small punctures and has glossy spots near its base.
