= Polyphylla sikkimensis =

Scientific classification
- Kingdom: Animalia
- Phylum: Arthropoda
- Clade: Pancrustacea
- Class: Insecta
- Order: Coleoptera
- Suborder: Polyphaga
- Infraorder: Scarabaeiformia
- Family: Scarabaeidae
- Tribe: Melolonthini
- Genus: Polyphylla
- Species: P. sikkimensis

Binomial name
- Polyphylla sikkimensis Brenske, 1896

Synonyms
- Polyphylla albosparsa Moser, 1919

Species of beetle

Polyphylla sikkimensis is a species of beetle of the family Scarabaeidae. It is found in Bhutan, China (Xizang), India (Himachal Pradesh, Sikkim, Uttarakhand) and Nepal.

== Description ==
Adults reach a length of about 28–33 mm. They are similar to Polyphylla maculipennis and shares the deeply indented anterior margin of the clypeus, although it is slightly more broadened anteriorly. The pronotum is somewhat less narrowed anteriorly, and the lateral margins are straighter behind the middle. On the elytra, the scale patches are very small, and the scales within them are not as densely packed as in maculipennis.

== Subspecies ==
- Polyphylla sikkimensis sikkimensis (Bhutan, China: Xizang, India: Sikkim, Uttarakhand, Nepal)
- Polyphylla sikkimensis albosparsa Moser, 1919 (India: Himachal Pradesh)
