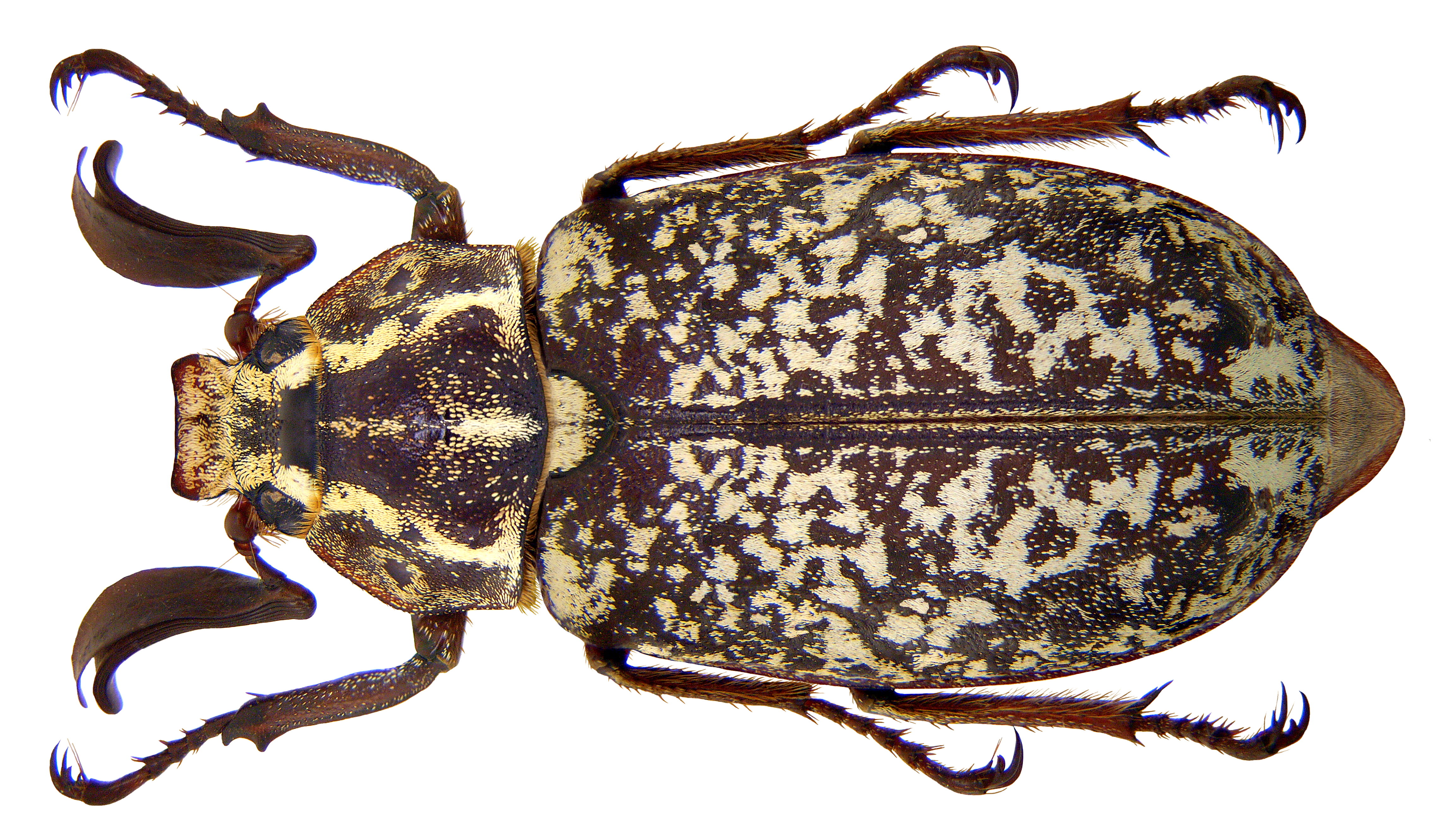

Scientific classification
- Kingdom: Animalia
- Phylum: Arthropoda
- Clade: Pancrustacea
- Class: Insecta
- Order: Coleoptera
- Suborder: Polyphaga
- Infraorder: Scarabaeiformia
- Family: Scarabaeidae
- Tribe: Melolonthini
- Genus: Polyphylla
- Species: P. olivieri

Binomial name
- Polyphylla olivieri (Castelnau, 1840)

Synonyms
- Melolontha olivieri Castelnau, 1840; Polyphylla caucasica Heyden, 1864; Polyphylla abhasica Motschulsky, 1845

= Polyphylla olivieri =

Species of beetle

Polyphylla olivieri is a species of beetle in the family Scarabaeidae. It is distributed throughout Transcaucasia, Greece up to Turkey, Georgia, Armenia, Syria, Lebanon, Israel, Azerbaijan, and Iran. Adult body length 30–37.8 mm; width 14.2–18.5 mm. Adults are black or brownish black, forewings are covered with white, marbled spots. The antennal club is black and brown. They live on dense soils, as opposed to the pine chafer (Polyphylla fullo), which live on sands. They live in loamy soils, lays up to 40 eggs. The larva is yellow, curved like an arc, 8 cm long; it overwinters in the soil several times, because it takes 3–5 years to grow one generation. The larvae feed on plant roots, especially in young vines and fruit trees.
