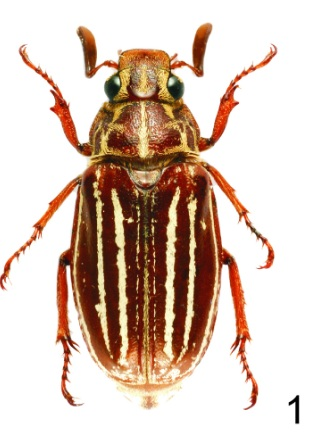

Scientific classification
- Kingdom: Animalia
- Phylum: Arthropoda
- Clade: Pancrustacea
- Class: Insecta
- Order: Coleoptera
- Suborder: Polyphaga
- Infraorder: Scarabaeiformia
- Family: Scarabaeidae
- Tribe: Melolonthini
- Genus: Polyphylla
- Species: P. simoni

Binomial name
- Polyphylla simoni Sehnal & Bezděk, 2011

= Polyphylla simoni =

Species of beetle

Polyphylla simoni is a species of beetle of the family Scarabaeidae. It is found in Thailand and Vietnam.

== Description ==
Adults reach a length of about 20–23 mm. They have an elongate, moderately convex body. The surface colour is chestnut brown, with the pronotum very slightly darker. The dorsal surface of the head, pronotum and scutellum is covered with whitish to pale ochrous scales, and the elytra with whitish scales.

== Subspecies ==
- Polyphylla simoni simoni (Thailand)
- Polyphylla simoni kontumensis Kobayashi & Fujioka, 2016 (Vietnam)

== Etymology ==
The species is named in honor of Šimon, son of the first author.
