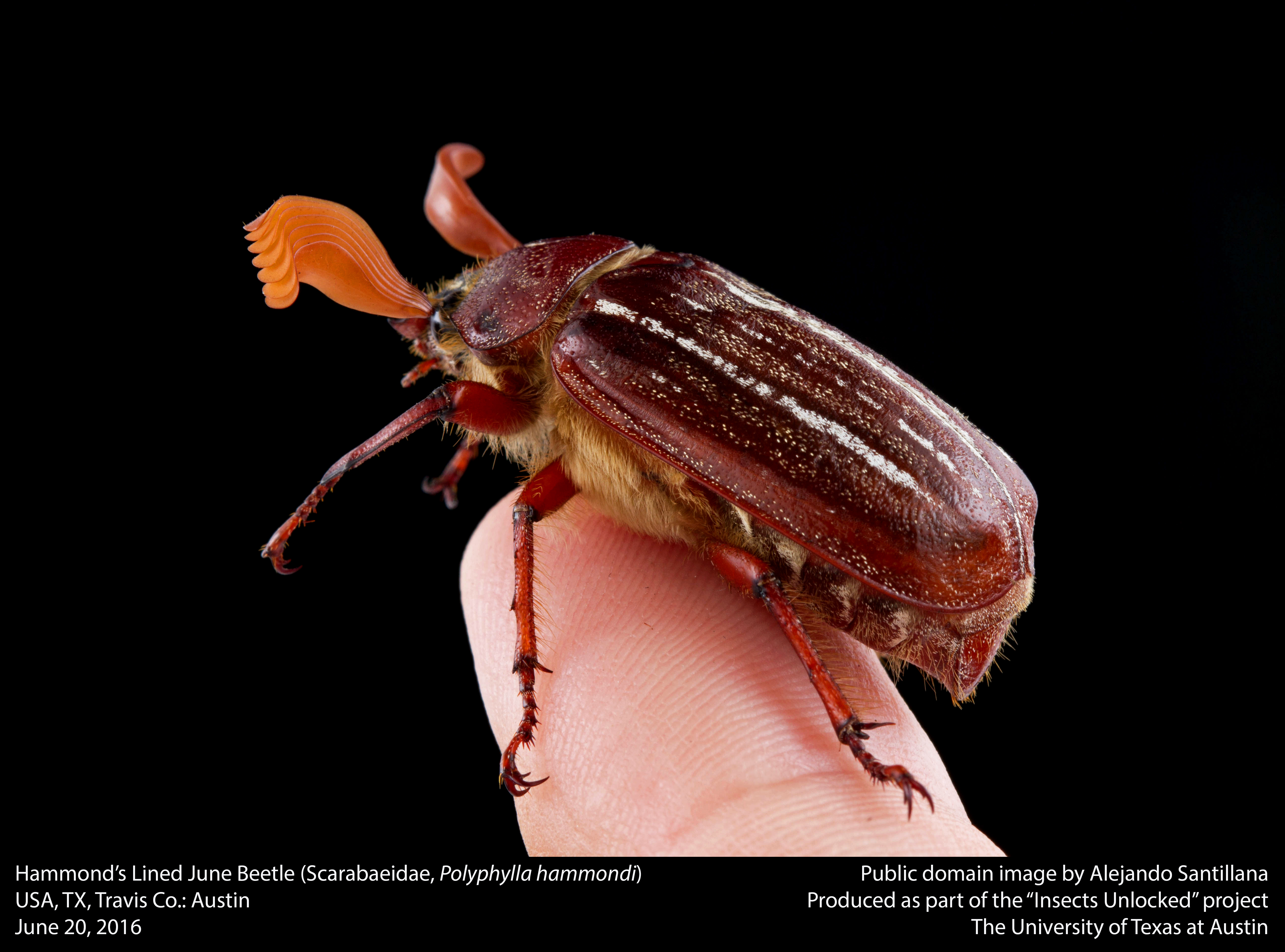

Scientific classification
- Kingdom: Animalia
- Phylum: Arthropoda
- Clade: Pancrustacea
- Class: Insecta
- Order: Coleoptera
- Suborder: Polyphaga
- Infraorder: Scarabaeiformia
- Family: Scarabaeidae
- Tribe: Melolonthini
- Genus: Polyphylla
- Species: P. hammondi

Binomial name
- Polyphylla hammondi LeConte, 1856

Synonyms
- Polyphylla acomana Casey, 1914; Polyphylla bisinuata Casey, 1914; Polyphylla diffusa Casey, 1914; Polyphylla impigra Casey, 1914; Polyphylla latifrons Casey, 1914; Polyphylla molesta Casey, 1914; Polyphylla oblita Casey, 1914; Polyphylla oklahomensis Hatch, 1926; Polyphylla pimalis Casey, 1914; Polyphylla proba Casey, 1914; Polyphylla rufescenta Tanner, 1928; Polyphylla sejuncta Casey, 1914; Polyphylla speciosa Casey, 1889; Polyphylla squamicauda Casey, 1914; Polyphylla subvittata LeConte, 1856; Polyphylla verecunda Casey, 1914

= Polyphylla hammondi =

Species of beetle

Polyphylla hammondi, or Hammond's lined June beetle, is a species of scarab beetle in the family Scarabaeidae. It is found in Central America and North America.

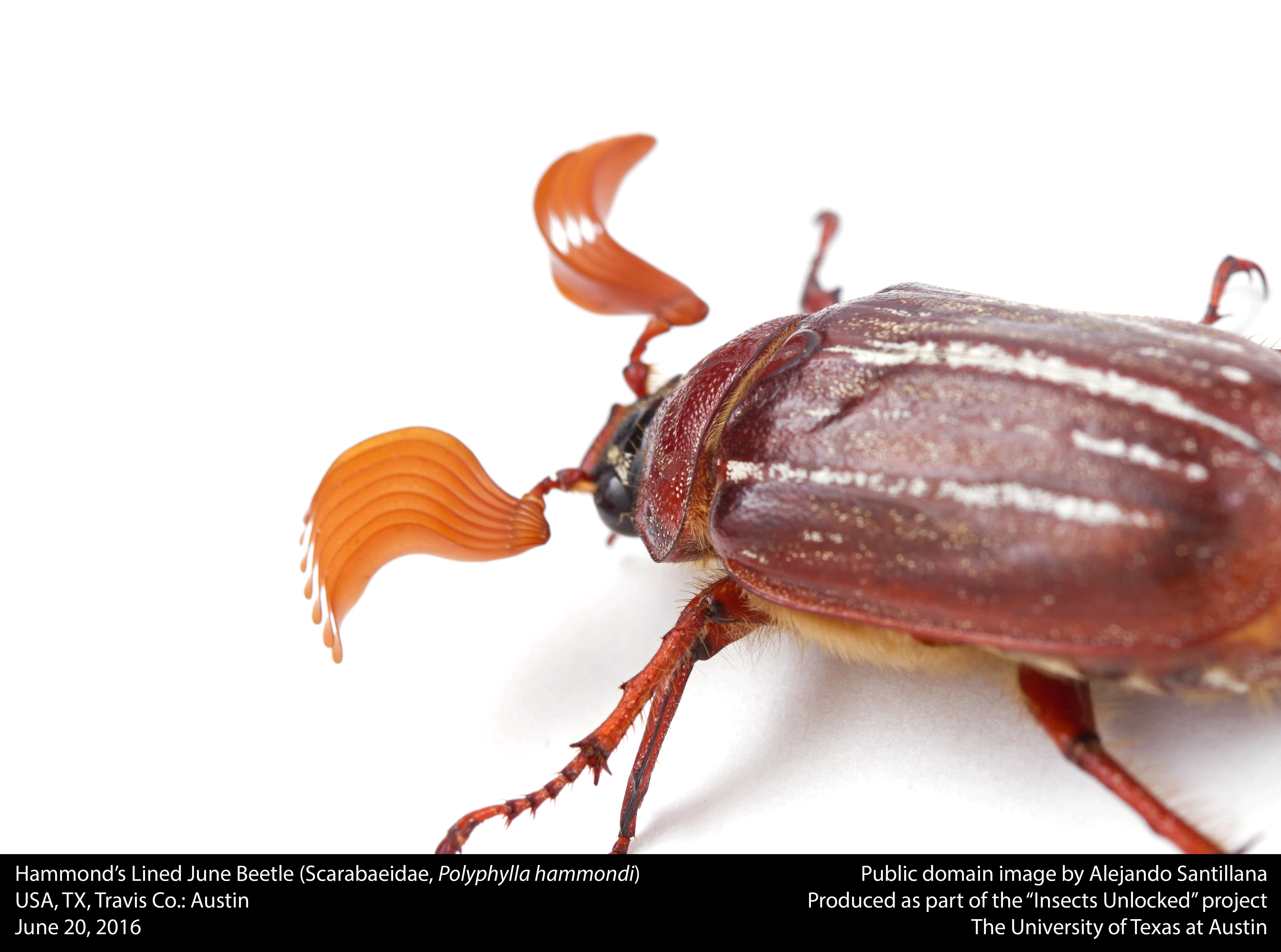
Hammond's lined June beetle, Polyphylla hammondi

== Description ==
Adults reach a length of about 24.8–35.5 mm (0.98–1.40 in). They are highly variable in colour and have almost no stripes or mottling.

== Distribution ==
It has been recorded from Canada (Alberta, Manitoba, Saskatchewan), the United States (Arizona, Arkansas, California, Colorado, Illinois, Indiana, Iowa, Kansas, Louisiana, Minnesota, Mississippi, Missouri, Montana, Nebraska, Nevada, New Mexico, North Dakota, Oklahoma, South Dakota, Utah, Wisconsin, Wyoming, Texas) and Mexico (Aguascalientes, Chihuahua, Coahuila, Durango, Hidalgo, Jalisco, Morelos, Oaxaca, Puebla, San Luis Potosí).
