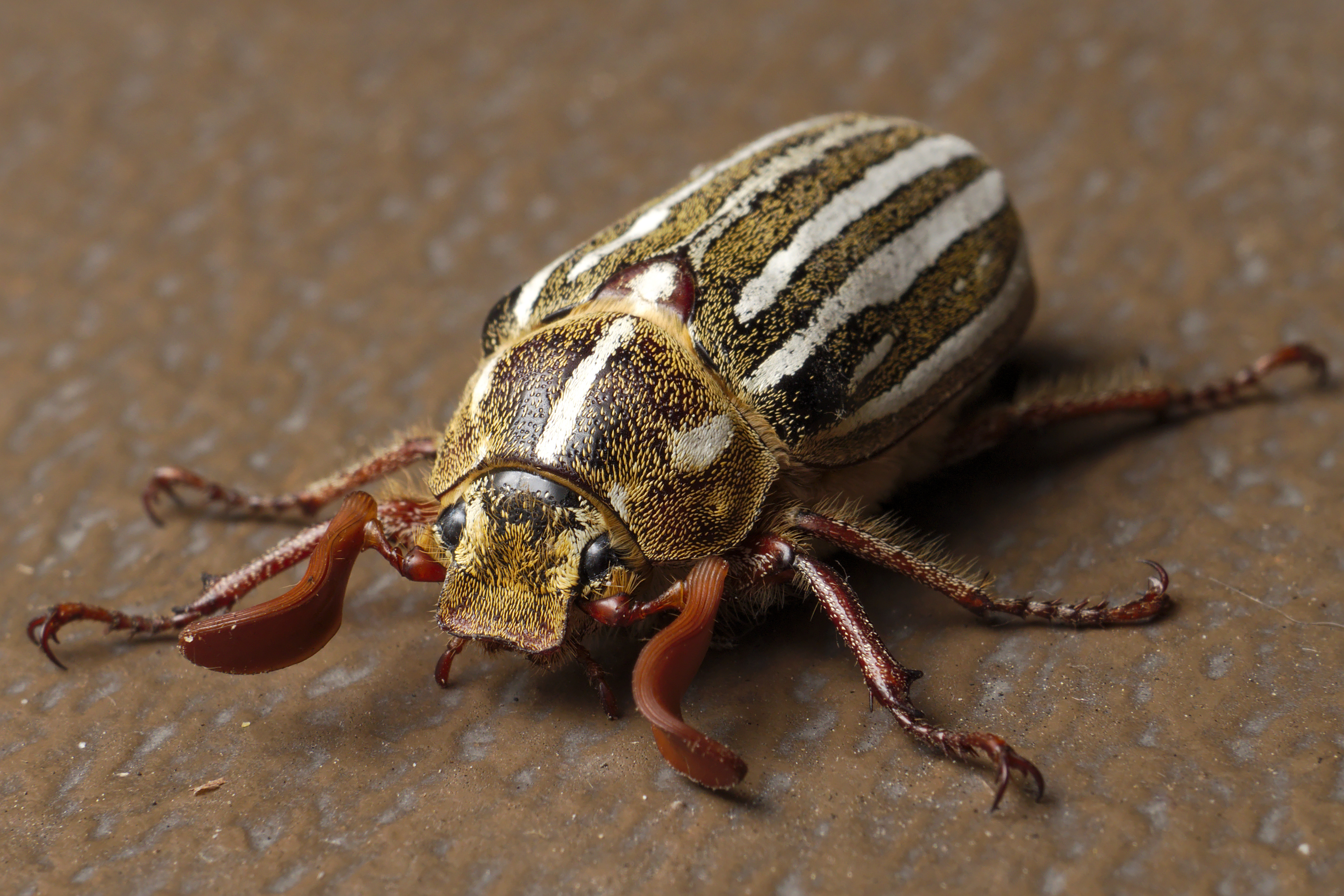

Scientific classification
- Kingdom: Animalia
- Phylum: Arthropoda
- Clade: Pancrustacea
- Class: Insecta
- Order: Coleoptera
- Suborder: Polyphaga
- Infraorder: Scarabaeiformia
- Family: Scarabaeidae
- Genus: Polyphylla
- Species: P. decemlineata

Binomial name
- Polyphylla decemlineata (Say, 1823)

= Ten-lined June beetle =

Species of beetle

The ten-lined June beetle (Polyphylla decemlineata), also known as the watermelon beetle, is a scarab beetle found in the western United States and Canada. The adults are attracted to light and feed on foliage, notably mature pine needles. They can make a hissing sound when touched or otherwise disturbed, which can resemble the hissing of a bat. This sound is made by their wings pushing down, forcing the air out between their wings and back. They can be an agricultural pest affecting a wide range of crops because their larvae feed on plant roots and can weaken or kill the plants.

== Description ==
They are relatively large in size, some growing to sizes as large as 1.5 inches (3 cm) or more. As in other members of this genus, the males have large distinctive antennae consisting of several lamellate plates, which they close up when threatened. The antennae are used to detect pheromones emitted by the females. The wing covers (elytra) have four long white stripes and one short stripe each. The underside of the thorax is covered with brownish hairs.

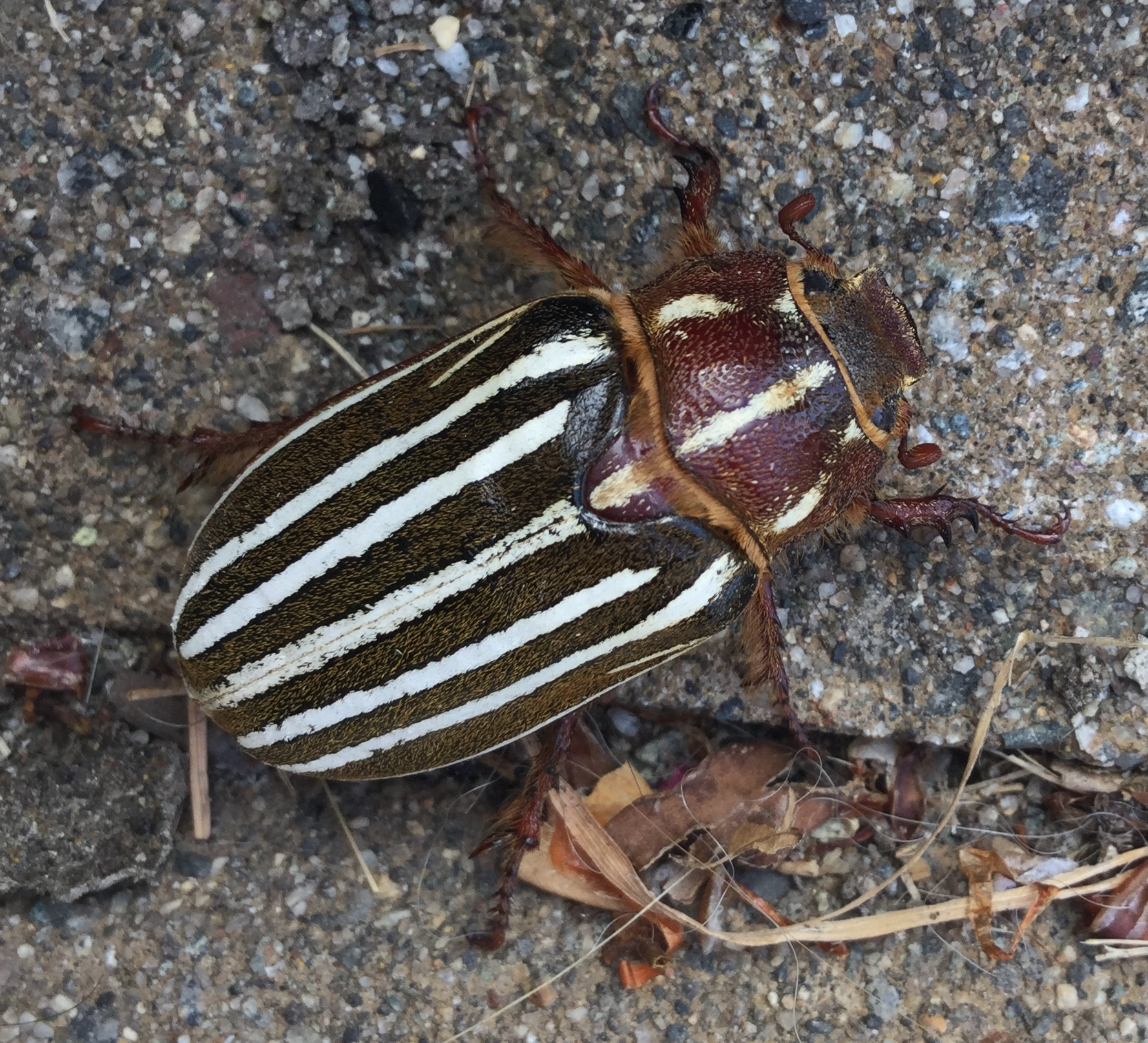
Ten-lined June beetle, Coquitlam, July 26, 2017.

== Identification ==
This species is commonly confused with Polyphylla crinita, also known as the Long Haired June Beetle. Polyphylla decemlineata, or the ten-lined June beetle, has scales on the pronotum. The Long Haired June beetle (Polyphylla crinita) instead has setae (hair) on the pronotum. Due to this difference, these species require high resolution photos for differentiation between the two.

== Life cycle ==
Eggs: The eggs are oval, dull, and creamy. They are about 1/16 of an inch long.
Larva: The grub can grow up to 2 inches with 3 pairs of legs, with a white body and brown head. The larval stage can last as long as 4 years.

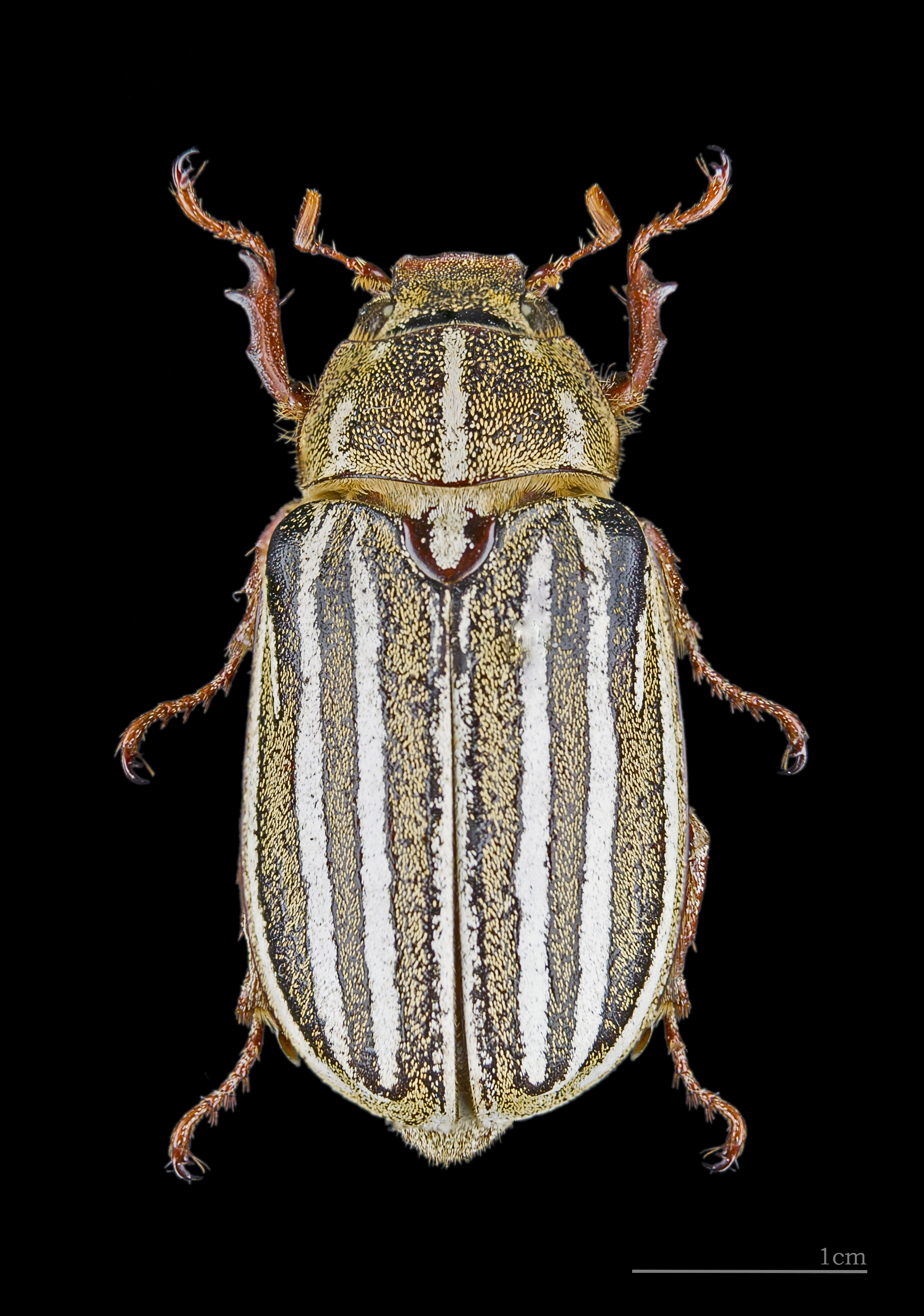
Dorsal side ♀

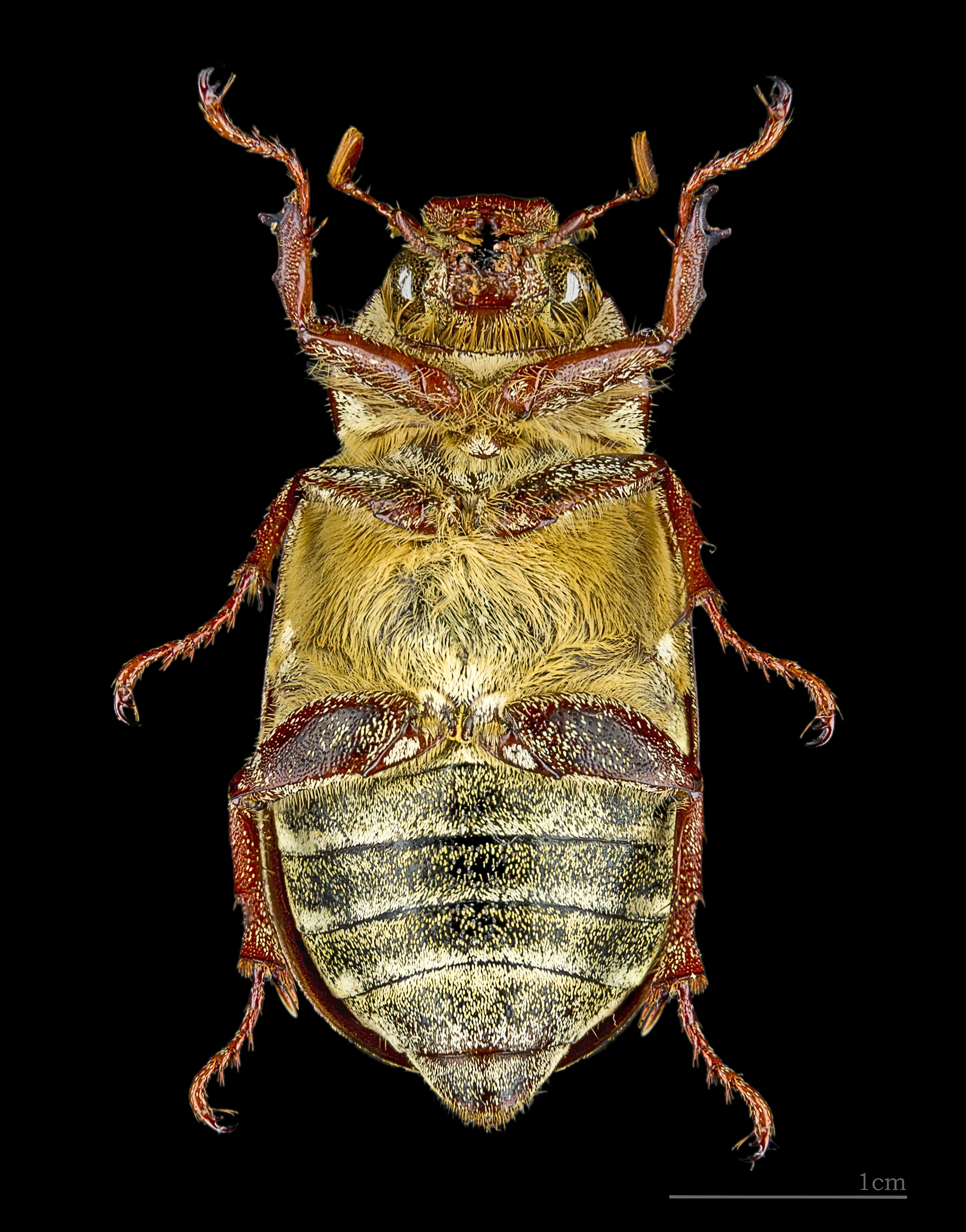
Ventral side ♀

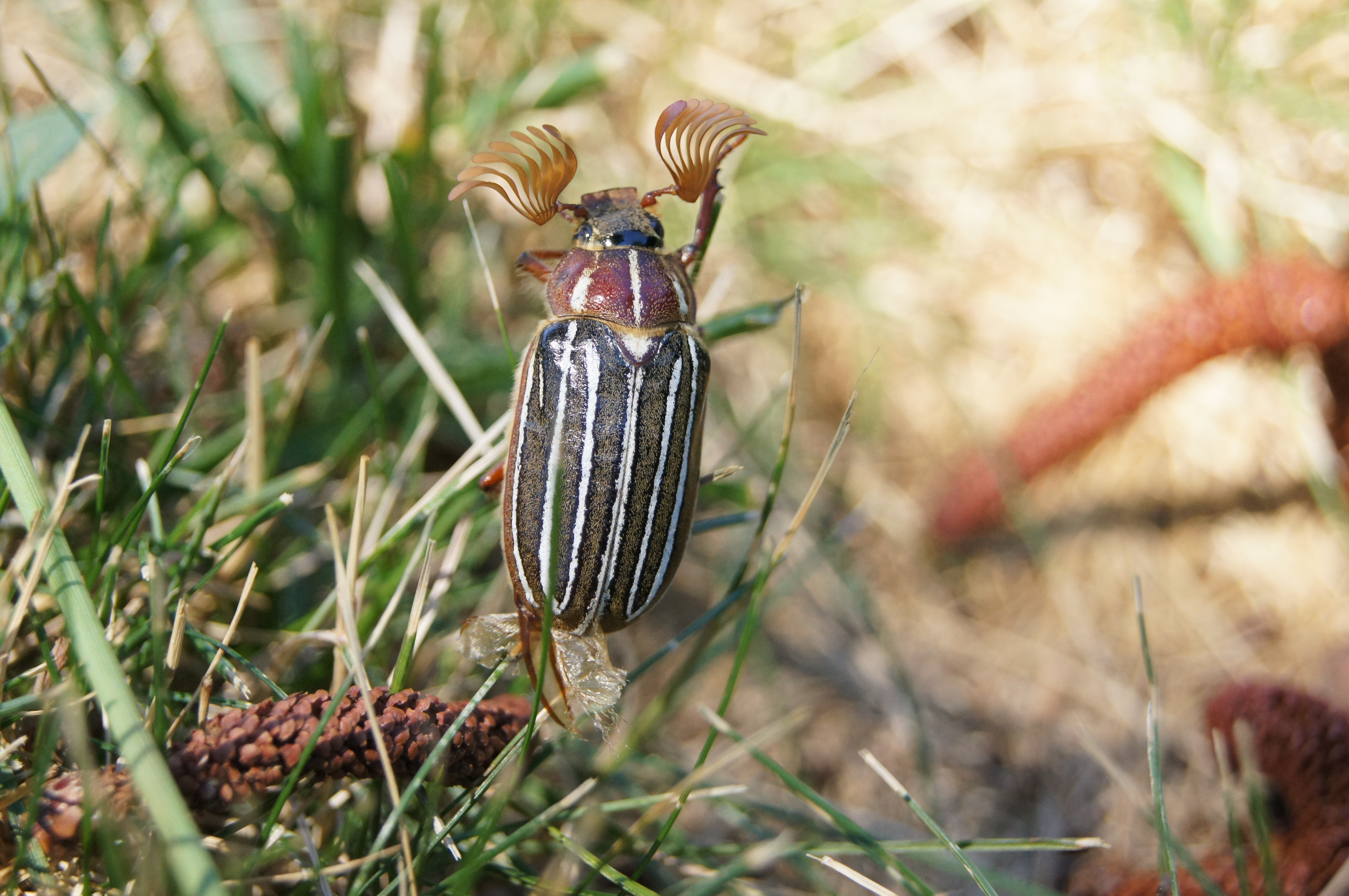
Ten Lined June Beetle ♂

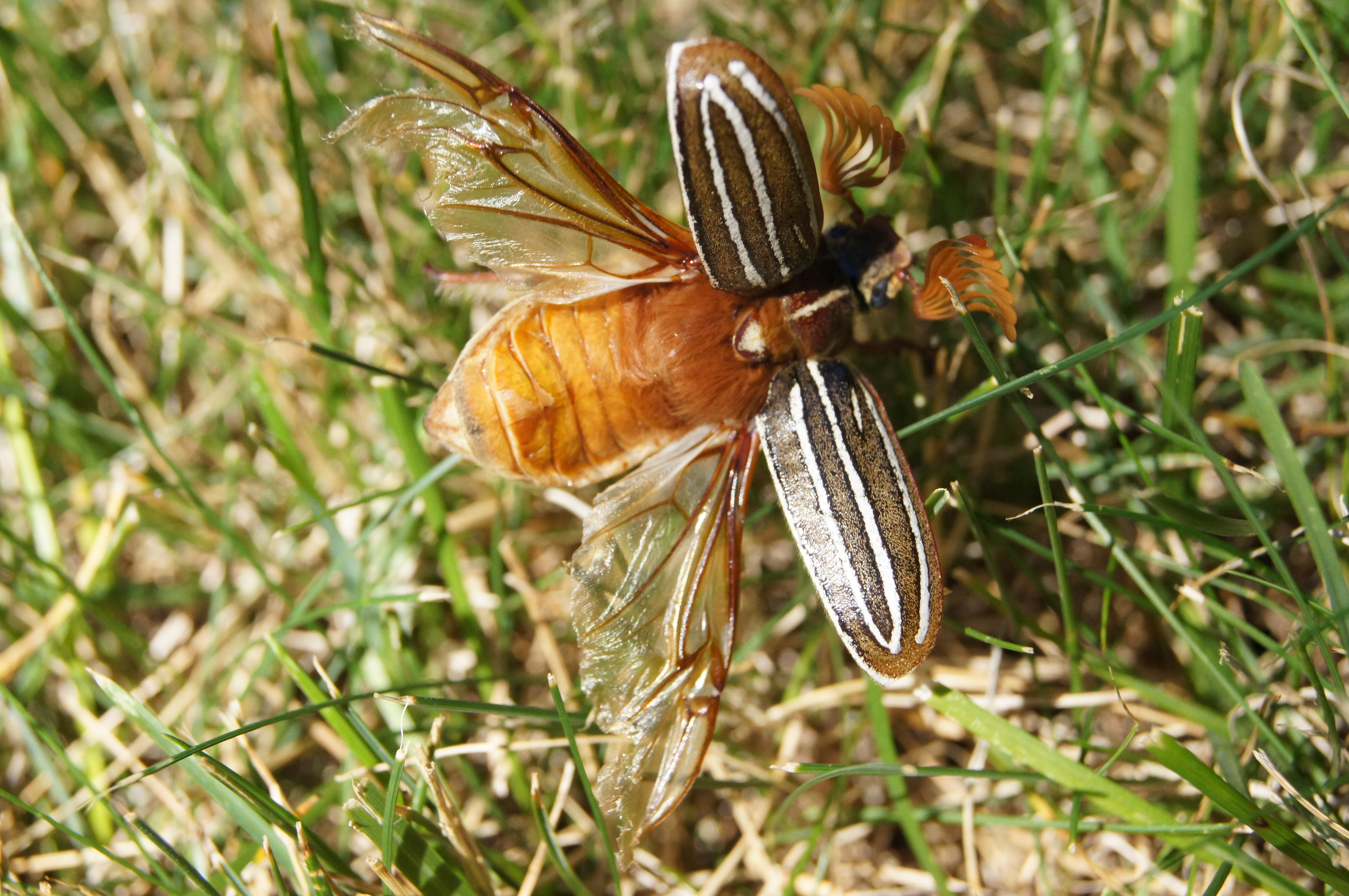
Ten Lined June Beetle - Open ♂

Coming back to life after a cool night

Polyphylla decemlineata aka Ten-lined June beetle feeding on Pine Needle

Two Polyphylla decemlineata aka Ten-lined June beetle feeding on Pine Needle
