= Polyphylla diffracta =

Scientific classification
- Kingdom: Animalia
- Phylum: Arthropoda
- Clade: Pancrustacea
- Class: Insecta
- Order: Coleoptera
- Suborder: Polyphaga
- Infraorder: Scarabaeiformia
- Family: Scarabaeidae
- Tribe: Melolonthini
- Genus: Polyphylla
- Species: P. diffracta

Binomial name
- Polyphylla diffracta Casey, 1891

Synonyms
- Polyphylla adusta Casey, 1914; Polyphylla alleni Cazier, 1939; Polyphylla arida Van Dyke, 1947; Polyphylla fuscula Fall, 1908; Polyphylla laevicauda Casey, 1914; Polyphylla opposita Casey, 1914; Polyphylla uteana Tanner, 1928

Species of beetle

Polyphylla diffracta is a species of scarab beetle in the family Scarabaeidae. It is found in Central America and North America.
