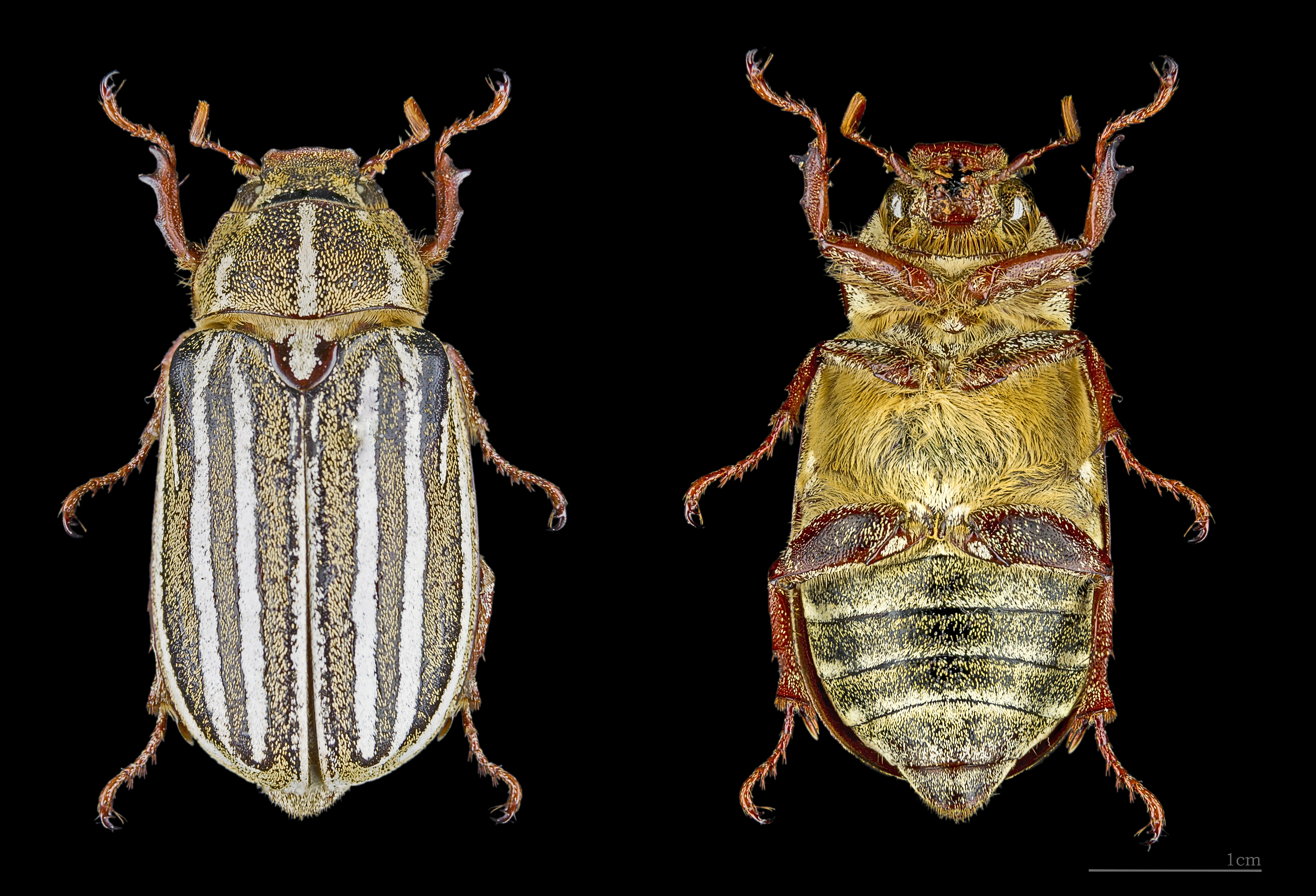
- Female Polyphylla decemlineata

Scientific classification
- Kingdom: Animalia
- Phylum: Arthropoda
- Class: Insecta
- Order: Coleoptera
- Suborder: Polyphaga
- Infraorder: Scarabaeiformia
- Family: Scarabaeidae
- Subfamily: Melolonthinae
- Tribe: Melolonthini
- Genus: Polyphylla; Harris, 1841

= Polyphylla =

Genus of beetles

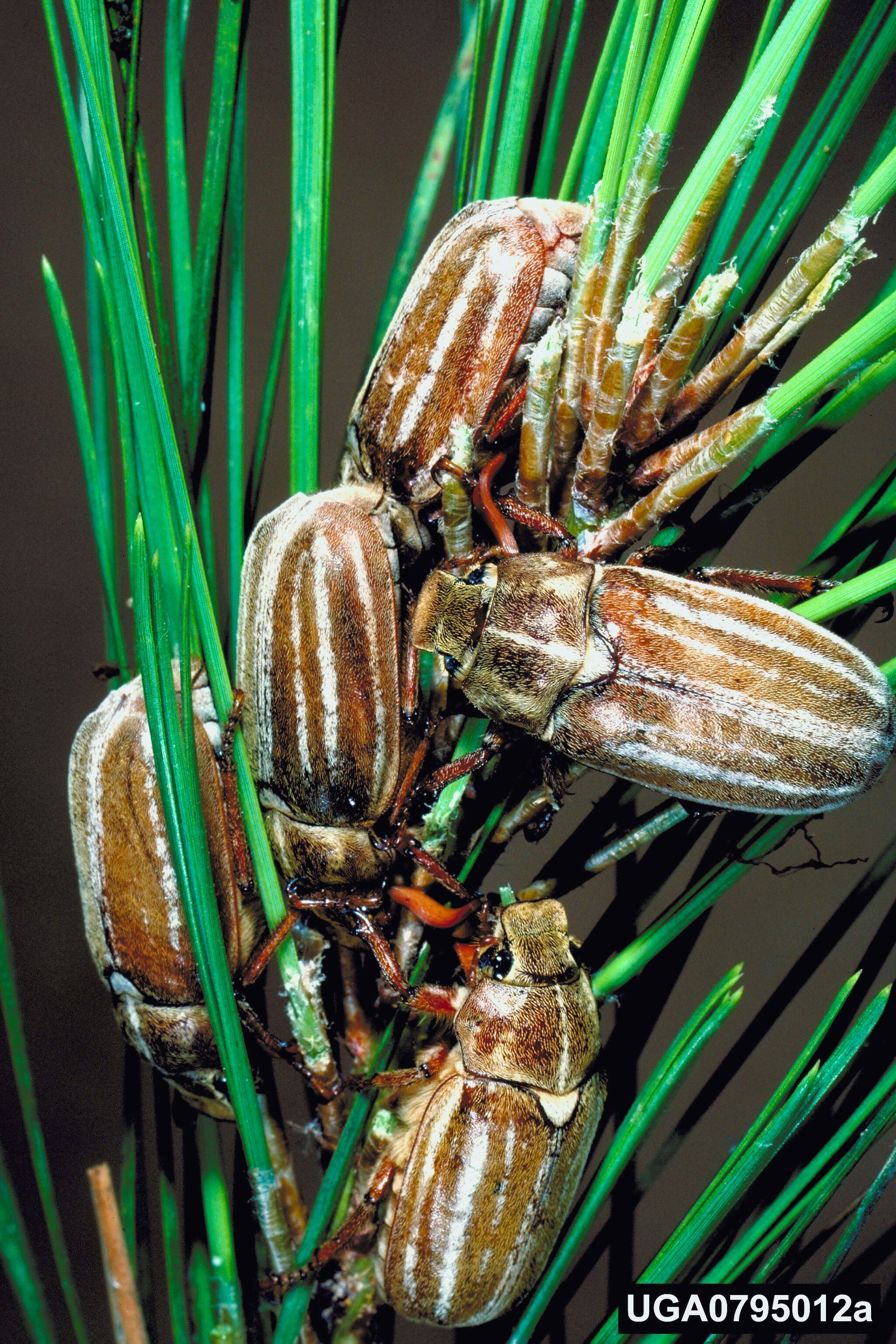
Polyphylla occidentalis

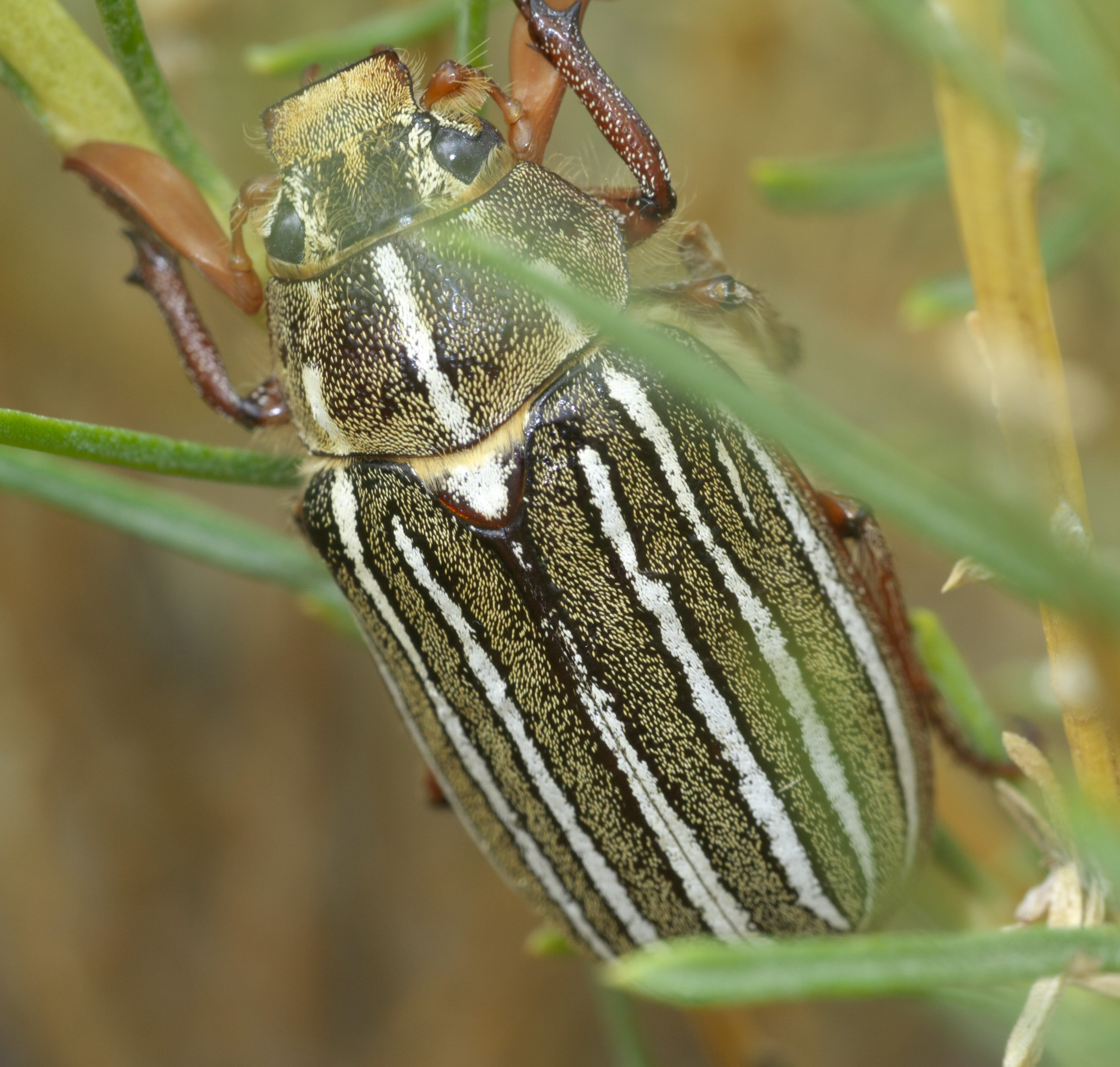
Polyphylla decemlineata

Polyphylla is a genus of scarab beetle includes more than 80 species distributed in North America and Central America, southern and central Europe, northern Africa, and Southern Asia —from Asia Minor to Japan. They typically reside in forests and orchards with most being identified by white elytra scales forming stripes. The adult beetles are often attracted to lights. Polyphylla lay their eggs on soil near plants from where the larvae hatch and burrow down to the roots on which they will feed. They reach maturity in two to three years.

== Species ==
These 85 species belong to the genus Polyphylla:

- Polyphylla adspersa Motschulsky, 1854^{c g}
- Polyphylla aeola La Rue, 1998^{i}
- Polyphylla aeolus La Rue, 1998^{c g b}
- Polyphylla alba (Pallas, 1773)^{c g}
- Polyphylla albertischulzi Kuntzen, 1933^{g}
- Polyphylla albolineata (Motschulsky, 1861)^{c g}
- Polyphylla anivallis La Rue, 2016^{c g}
- Polyphylla annamensis (Fleutiaux, 1887)^{c g}
- Polyphylla anteronivea Hardy, 1978^{i c g b} (saline valley snow-front scarab)
- Polyphylla arguta Casey, 1914^{i c g b}
- Polyphylla avittata Hardy, 1978^{i c g b} (spotted Warner valley dunes June beetle)
- Polyphylla barbata Cazier, 1938^{i c g b} (Mount Hermon June beetle)
- Polyphylla boryi (Brullé, 1832)^{c g}
- Polyphylla brownae Young, 1986^{i c g}
- Polyphylla cavifrons LeConte, 1854^{i c g b}
- Polyphylla comes Casey, 1914^{i c g b}
- Polyphylla concurrens Casey, 1889^{c g}
- Polyphylla conspersa Burmeister, 1855^{c g}
- Polyphylla crinita LeConte, 1856^{i c g b}
- Polyphylla dahnshuensis Li & Yang, 1997^{c g}
- Polyphylla davidis Fairmaire, 1888^{c g}
- Polyphylla decemlineata (Say, 1824)^{i c g b} (ten-lined June beetle)
- Polyphylla devestiva Young, 1966^{i c g}
- Polyphylla diffracta Casey, 1891^{i c g b}
- Polyphylla donaldsoni Skelley, 2005^{i c g b} (Donaldson's lined June beetle)
- Polyphylla edentula (Harold, 1878)^{c g}
- Polyphylla erratica Hardy, 1978^{i c g b} (Death Valley June beetle)
- Polyphylla exilis Zhang, 1984^{c g}
- Polyphylla formosana Niijima & Kinosheta, 1923^{c g}
- Polyphylla fullo (Linnaeus, 1758)^{c g}
- Polyphylla gracilicornis (Blanchard, 1871)^{c g}
- Polyphylla gracilis Horn, 1881^{i c g b} (slender polyphyllan scarab beetle)
- Polyphylla hammondi LeConte, 1856^{i c g b} (Hammond's lined June beetle)
- Polyphylla hassi Hass & Reichenbach, 2014^{c g}
- Polyphylla hirsuta Van Dyke, 1933^{i c g b}
- Polyphylla intermedia Zhang, 1981^{c g}
- Polyphylla irrorata (Gebler, 1841)^{c g}
- Polyphylla jessopi De Wailly, 1997^{c g}
- Polyphylla koso La Rue, 2016^{c g}
- Polyphylla laticollis Lewis, 1887^{c g}
- Polyphylla lerestifi Guerlach, 2012^{c g}
- Polyphylla maculipennis Moser, 1919^{c g}
- Polyphylla maroccana Peyerimhoff, 1925^{c g}
- Polyphylla mescalerensis Young, 1988^{i c g b}
- Polyphylla minor Nomura, 1977^{c g}
- Polyphylla modulata Casey, 1914^{i c g}
- Polyphylla monahansensis Hardy, 1978^{i c g b} (Monahan's ten-lined June beetle)
- Polyphylla morroensis La Rue, 2016^{c g}
- Polyphylla multimaculata Hardy, 1981^{i c g}
- Polyphylla navarretei Zidek, 2006^{c g}
- Polyphylla naxiana Reitter, 1902^{c g}
- Polyphylla nigra Casey, 1914^{i c g b}
- Polyphylla nikodymi De Wailly, 1997^{c g}
- Polyphylla nubecula Frey, 1962^{c g}
- Polyphylla nubila Van Dyke, 1947^{i c g b} (atascadero June beetle)
- Polyphylla occidentalis (Linnaeus, 1767)^{i c g b}
- Polyphylla olivieri (Castelnau, 1840)^{c g}
- Polyphylla parva Kobayashi & Chou, 2008^{c g}
- Polyphylla persica Brenske, 1902^{c g}
- Polyphylla petitii (Guérin-Méneville, 1844)^{i c g}
- Polyphylla phongsali Zidek, 2006^{c g}
- Polyphylla ploceki Tesar, 1944^{c g}
- Polyphylla pottsorum Hardy, 1978^{i c g b}
- Polyphylla pubescens Cartwright, 1939^{i c g}
- Polyphylla ragusae Kraatz, 1882^{c g}
- Polyphylla ratcliffei Young, 1986^{i}
- Polyphylla rugosipennis Casey, 1914^{i c g}
- Polyphylla schestakowi Semenov, 1900^{c g}
- Polyphylla schoenfeldti Brenske, 1890^{c g}
- Polyphylla sicardi Bedel, 1917^{c g}
- Polyphylla sikkimensis Brenske, 1896^{c g}
- Polyphylla simoni Sehnal & Bezdek, 2011^{c g}
- Polyphylla sobrina Casey, 1914^{i c g b}
- Polyphylla socorriana La Rue, 2016^{c g}
- Polyphylla squamiventris Cazier, 1939^{i c g}
- Polyphylla starkae Skelley, 2009^{c g b} (auburndale scrub scarab beetle)
- Polyphylla stellata Young, 1986^{i c g}
- Polyphylla taiwana (Sawada, 1950)^{c g}
- Polyphylla tonkinensis Dewailly, 1945^{c g}
- Polyphylla tridentata Reitter, 1890^{c g}
- Polyphylla turkmenoglui Petrovitz, 1965^{c g}
- Polyphylla uteana Casey, 1892^{c g b}
- Polyphylla variolosa (Hentz, 1830)^{i c g b} (variegated June beetle)
- Polyphylla vietnamica Kobayashi & Fujioka, 2016^{c g}
- Polyphylla woodruffi Skelley, 2005^{i c g}

Data sources: i = ITIS, c = Catalogue of Life, g = GBIF, b = Bugguide.net
