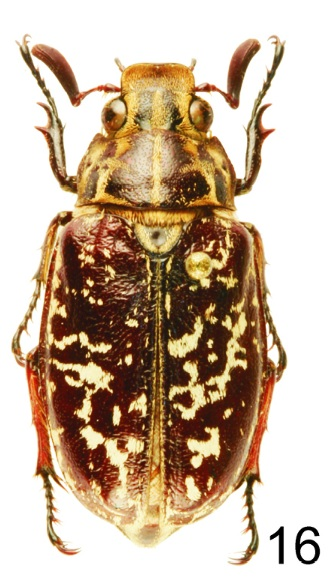
- Male
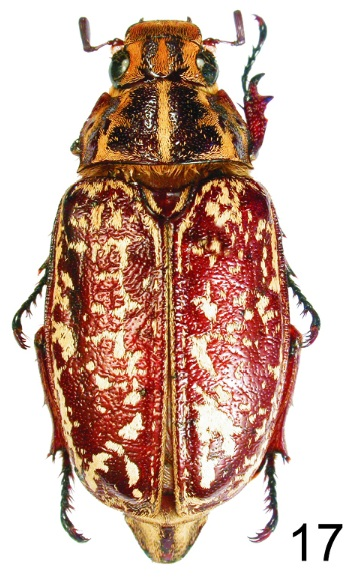
- Female

Scientific classification
- Kingdom: Animalia
- Phylum: Arthropoda
- Clade: Pancrustacea
- Class: Insecta
- Order: Coleoptera
- Suborder: Polyphaga
- Infraorder: Scarabaeiformia
- Family: Scarabaeidae
- Tribe: Melolonthini
- Genus: Polyphylla
- Species: P. phongsali

Binomial name
- Polyphylla phongsali Zídek, 2006

= Polyphylla phongsali =

Species of beetle

Polyphylla phongsali is a species of beetle of the family Scarabaeidae. It is found in Cambodia, Laos, Vietnam and China (Yunnan).
