= Polyphylla gracilis =

Scientific classification
- Kingdom: Animalia
- Phylum: Arthropoda
- Clade: Pancrustacea
- Class: Insecta
- Order: Coleoptera
- Suborder: Polyphaga
- Infraorder: Scarabaeiformia
- Family: Scarabaeidae
- Tribe: Melolonthini
- Genus: Polyphylla
- Species: P. gracilis

Binomial name
- Polyphylla gracilis Horn, 1881

Species of beetle

Polyphylla gracilis, the slender polyphyllan scarab beetle, is a species of scarab beetle in the family Scarabaeidae. It is found in North America, where it has been recorded from Florida, southeastern Alabama, and southwestern Georgia.

== Description ==
Adults reach a length of about 18.8–21.6 mm (0.74–0.85 in). They may be distinguished from related species by their mottled elytral colour pattern with a broad lateral stripe.
