= Polyphylla maculipennis =

Scientific classification
- Kingdom: Animalia
- Phylum: Arthropoda
- Clade: Pancrustacea
- Class: Insecta
- Order: Coleoptera
- Suborder: Polyphaga
- Infraorder: Scarabaeiformia
- Family: Scarabaeidae
- Tribe: Melolonthini
- Genus: Polyphylla
- Species: P. maculipennis

Binomial name
- Polyphylla maculipennis Moser, 1919

Species of beetle

Polyphylla maculipennis is a species of beetle of the family Scarabaeidae. It is found in China (Sichuan, Xizang, Yunnan).

== Description ==
Adults reach a length of about 29–32 mm. They are very similar to Polyphylla fullo, but slightly smaller and may be distinguished by the deeply indented clypeus.
