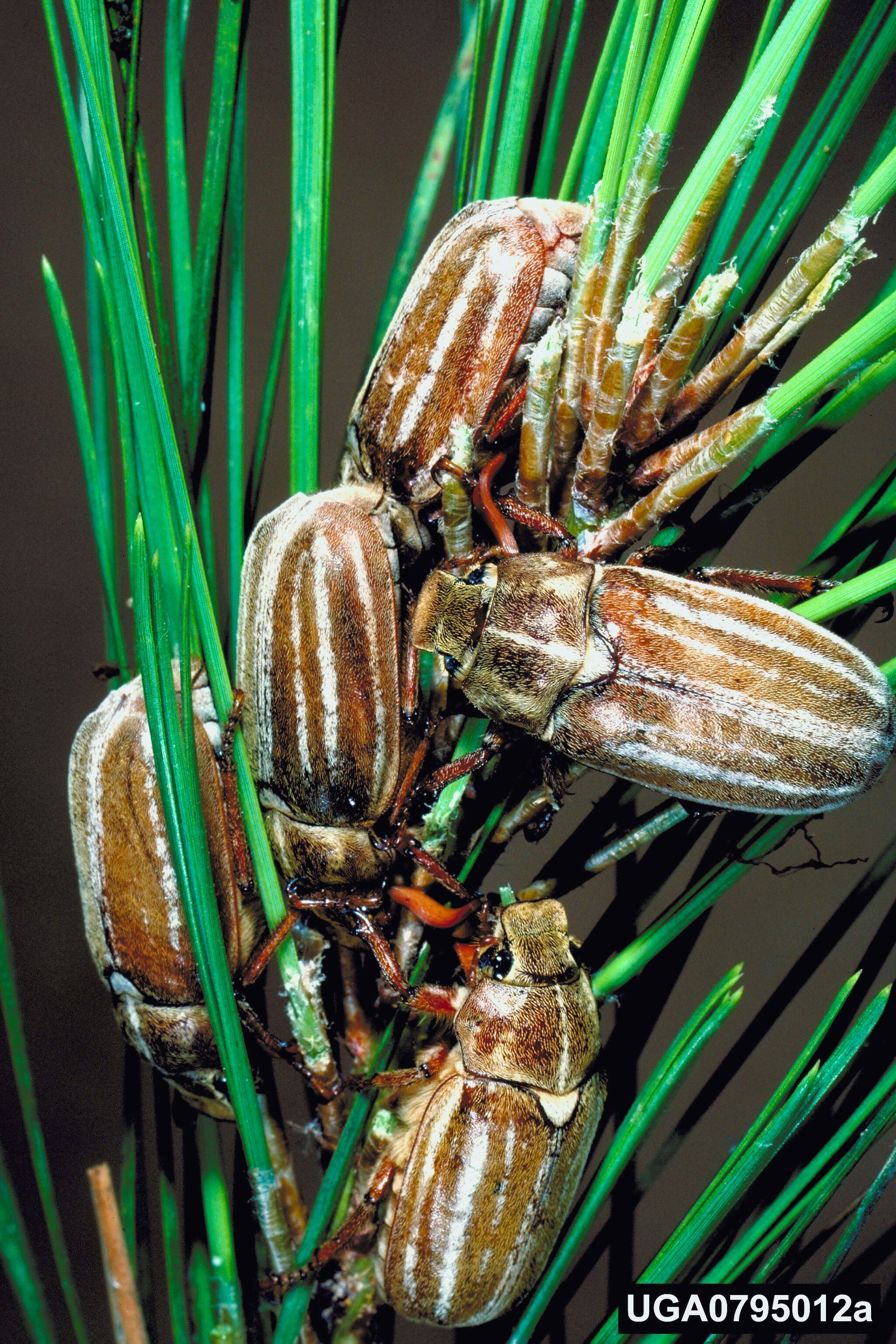

Scientific classification
- Kingdom: Animalia
- Phylum: Arthropoda
- Clade: Pancrustacea
- Class: Insecta
- Order: Coleoptera
- Suborder: Polyphaga
- Infraorder: Scarabaeiformia
- Family: Scarabaeidae
- Tribe: Melolonthini
- Genus: Polyphylla
- Species: P. occidentalis

Binomial name
- Polyphylla occidentalis (Linnaeus, 1767)

Synonyms
- Scarabaeus occidentalis Linnaeus, 1767

= Polyphylla occidentalis =

Species of beetle

Polyphylla occidentalis is a species of scarab beetle in the family Scarabaeidae. It is found in North America.

The beetle is widespread in the southeastern United States, and is active throughout the warm summer months. A brownish beetle with white stripes, its adult size ranges from 22 to 26 mm. The males' antennae have rather large clubs. The adults feed on pines, while the larvae eat sedge roots.
