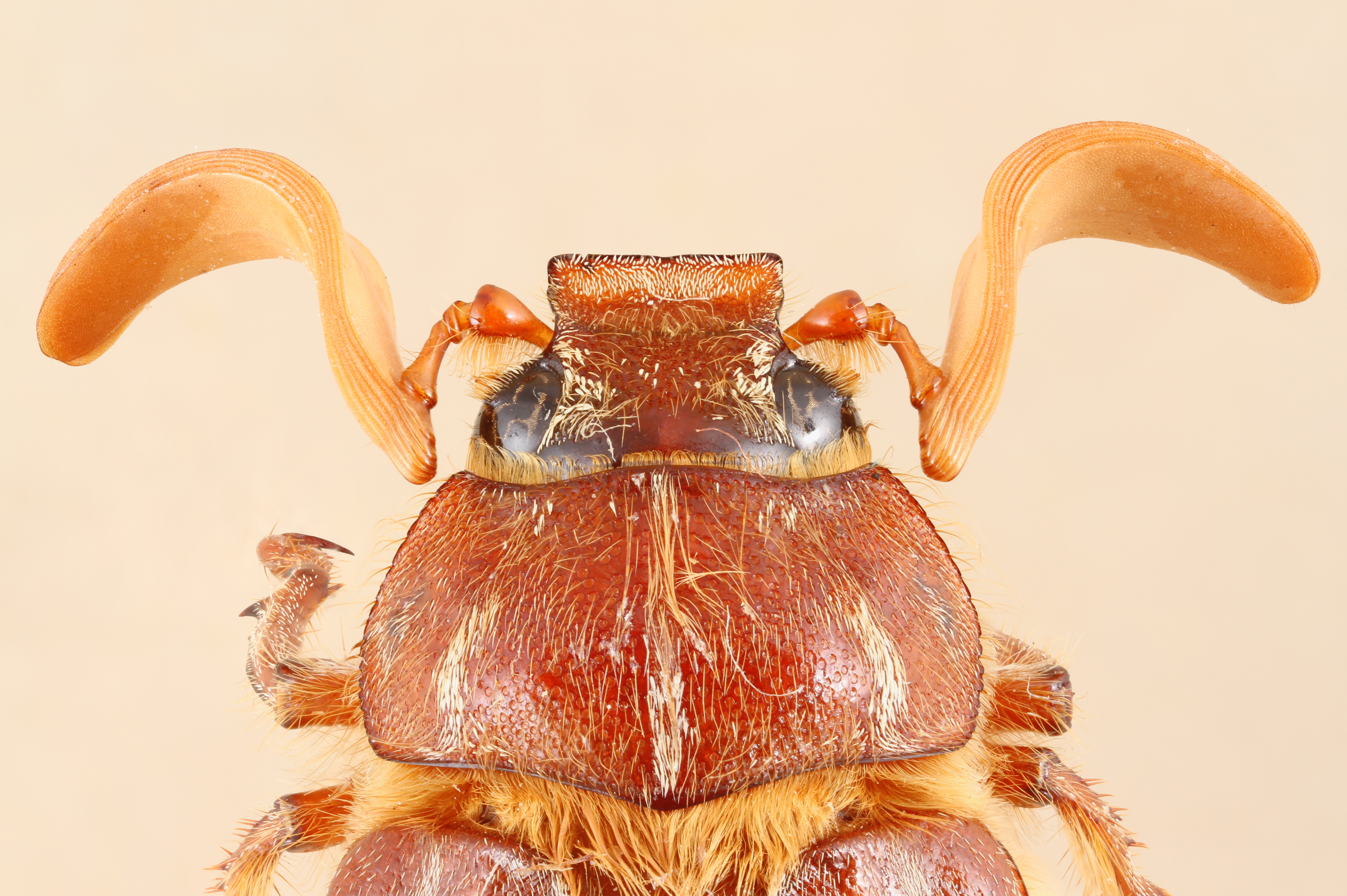

Scientific classification
- Kingdom: Animalia
- Phylum: Arthropoda
- Clade: Pancrustacea
- Class: Insecta
- Order: Coleoptera
- Suborder: Polyphaga
- Infraorder: Scarabaeiformia
- Family: Scarabaeidae
- Tribe: Melolonthini
- Genus: Polyphylla
- Species: P. monahansensis

Binomial name
- Polyphylla monahansensis Hardy, 1978

= Polyphylla monahansensis =

Species of beetle

Polyphylla monahansensis, or Monahan's ten-lined June beetle, is a species of scarab beetle in the family Scarabaeidae. It is found in North America.
