= Polyphylla hirsuta =

Scientific classification
- Kingdom: Animalia
- Phylum: Arthropoda
- Clade: Pancrustacea
- Class: Insecta
- Order: Coleoptera
- Suborder: Polyphaga
- Infraorder: Scarabaeiformia
- Family: Scarabaeidae
- Tribe: Melolonthini
- Genus: Polyphylla
- Species: P. hirsuta

Binomial name
- Polyphylla hirsuta Van Dyke, 1933

Species of beetle

Polyphylla hirsuta is a species in the subfamily Melolonthinae ("May beetles and junebugs"), in the order Coleoptera ("beetles"). It is found in North America.
