= Polyphylla mescalerensis =

Scientific classification
- Kingdom: Animalia
- Phylum: Arthropoda
- Clade: Pancrustacea
- Class: Insecta
- Order: Coleoptera
- Suborder: Polyphaga
- Infraorder: Scarabaeiformia
- Family: Scarabaeidae
- Tribe: Melolonthini
- Genus: Polyphylla
- Species: P. mescalerensis

Binomial name
- Polyphylla mescalerensis Young, 1988

Species of beetle

Polyphylla mescalerensis is a species of scarab beetle in the family Scarabaeidae. It is found in North America.
