= Polyphylla brownae =

Scientific classification
- Kingdom: Animalia
- Phylum: Arthropoda
- Clade: Pancrustacea
- Class: Insecta
- Order: Coleoptera
- Suborder: Polyphaga
- Infraorder: Scarabaeiformia
- Family: Scarabaeidae
- Tribe: Melolonthini
- Genus: Polyphylla
- Species: P. brownae

Binomial name
- Polyphylla brownae Young, 1986

Species of beetle

Polyphylla brownae is a species of beetle of the family Scarabaeidae. It is found in Alabama and Mississippi.

== Description ==
Adults reach a length of about 27–29.3 mm (1.06–1.15 in) (males) and about 25.5 mm (1.00 in) (females). They may be distinguished from related species by their lack of recumbent scales, no notable colour pattern and a pattern of coarse punctures on the pronotum.
