= Polyphylla anteronivea =

Scientific classification
- Kingdom: Animalia
- Phylum: Arthropoda
- Clade: Pancrustacea
- Class: Insecta
- Order: Coleoptera
- Suborder: Polyphaga
- Infraorder: Scarabaeiformia
- Family: Scarabaeidae
- Tribe: Melolonthini
- Genus: Polyphylla
- Species: P. anteronivea

Binomial name
- Polyphylla anteronivea Hardy, 1978

Species of beetle

Polyphylla anteronivea, known generally as the saline valley snow-front scarab or saline valley snow-front June beetle, is a species of scarab beetle in the family Scarabaeidae. It is found in North America.
