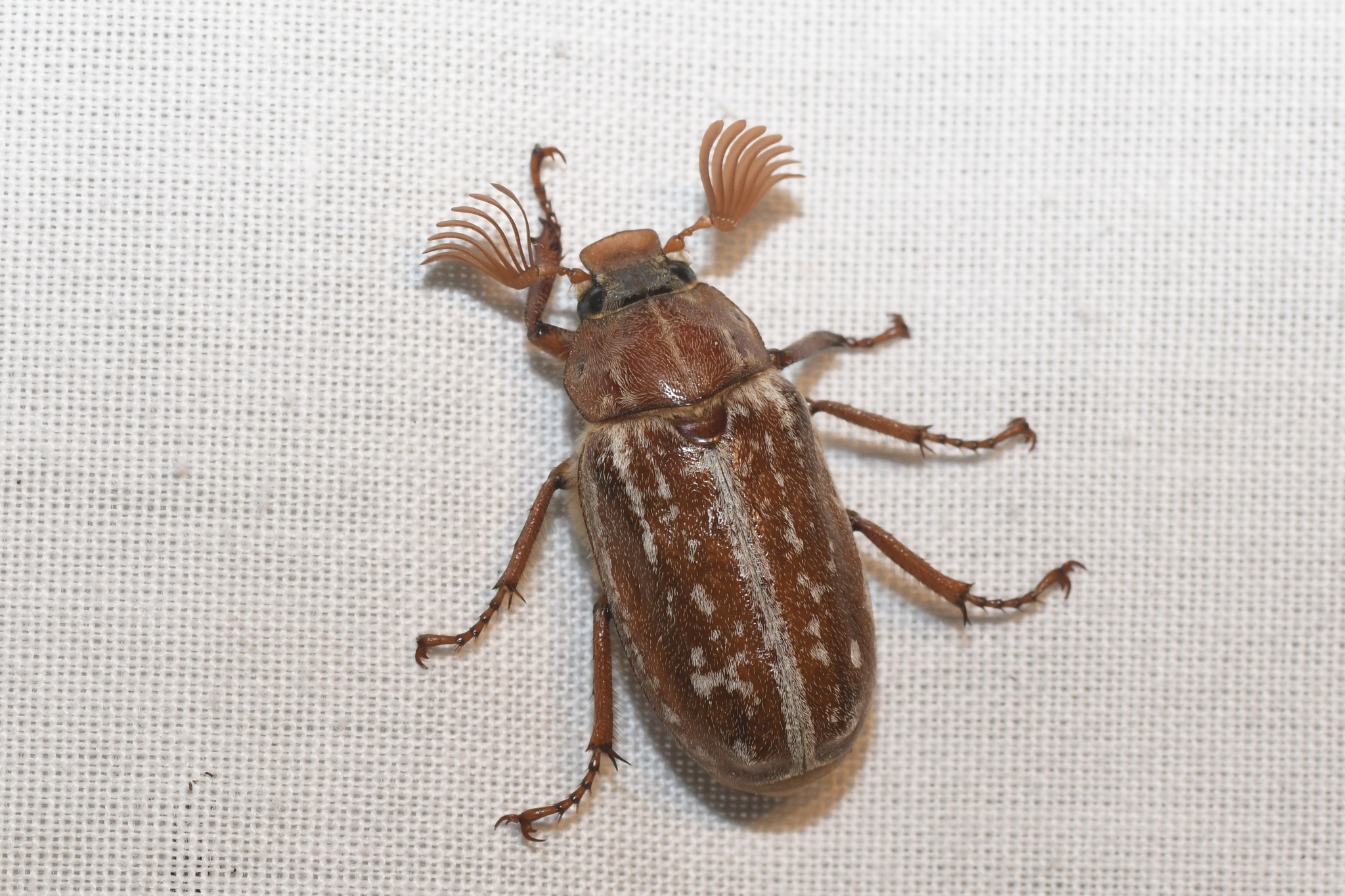

Scientific classification
- Kingdom: Animalia
- Phylum: Arthropoda
- Clade: Pancrustacea
- Class: Insecta
- Order: Coleoptera
- Suborder: Polyphaga
- Infraorder: Scarabaeiformia
- Family: Scarabaeidae
- Tribe: Melolonthini
- Genus: Polyphylla
- Species: P. variolosa

Binomial name
- Polyphylla variolosa (Hentz, 1830)

= Polyphylla variolosa =

Species of beetle

Polyphylla variolosa, the variegated June beetle, is a species of scarab beetle in the family Scarabaeidae. It is found in North America. It is reddish-brown and a little over two centimeters long. The club ends of the antennae are longer in the males than the females, and have seven antennomeres. Its habitat is sandy soils primarily near the Great Lakes and coastal regions from Quebec south to Virginia.
