= Polyphylla nigra =

Scientific classification
- Kingdom: Animalia
- Phylum: Arthropoda
- Clade: Pancrustacea
- Class: Insecta
- Order: Coleoptera
- Suborder: Polyphaga
- Infraorder: Scarabaeiformia
- Family: Scarabaeidae
- Tribe: Melolonthini
- Genus: Polyphylla
- Species: P. nigra

Binomial name
- Polyphylla nigra Casey, 1914

Synonyms
- Polyphylla martini von Bloeker, 1939; Polyphylla relicta Casey, 1914; Polyphylla robustula Casey, 1914; Polyphylla santacruzae von Bloeker, 1939

Species of beetle

Polyphylla nigra is a species of scarab beetle in the family Scarabaeidae. It is found in Central America and North America.
