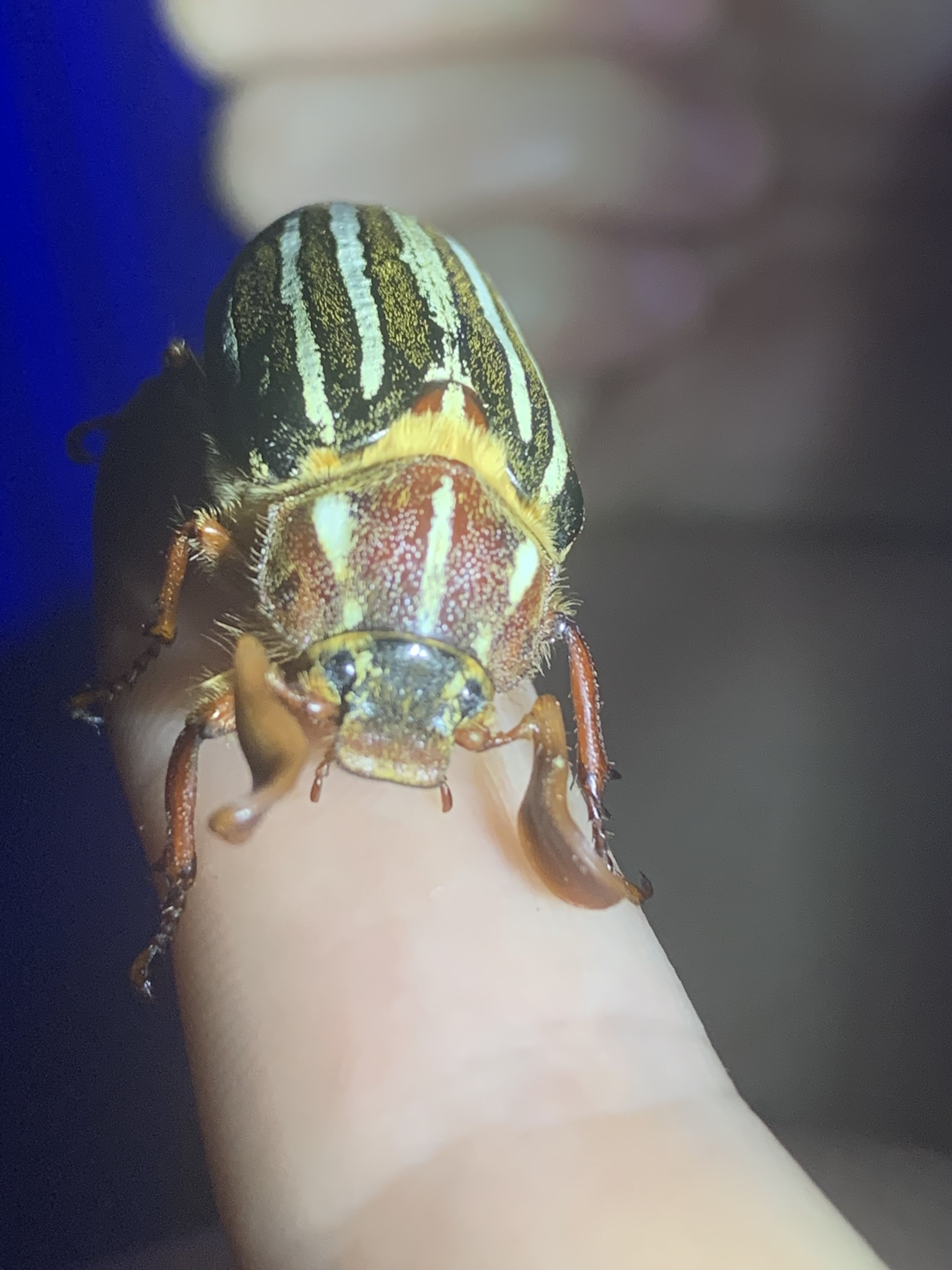

Scientific classification
- Kingdom: Animalia
- Phylum: Arthropoda
- Clade: Pancrustacea
- Class: Insecta
- Order: Coleoptera
- Suborder: Polyphaga
- Infraorder: Scarabaeiformia
- Family: Scarabaeidae
- Tribe: Melolonthini
- Genus: Polyphylla
- Species: P. crinita

Binomial name
- Polyphylla crinita LeConte, 1856

Synonyms
- Polyphylla incolumis Casey, 1914; Polyphylla mystica Casey, 1914; Polyphylla ona von Bloeker, 1939; Polyphylla pacifica Casey, 1895; Polyphylla perversa Casey, 1914; Polyphylla santarosae von Bloeker, 1939

= Polyphylla crinita =

Species of beetle

Polyphylla crinita is a species of scarab beetle in the family Scarabaeidae. It is found in Central America and North America.

== Identification ==
This species is commonly confused with Polyphylla decemlineata, also known as the ten-lined June beetle. The Long Haired June beetle (Polyphylla crinita) has setae (hair) on the pronotum. Polyphylla decemlineata, or the ten-lined June beetle, instead has scales on the pronotum. Due to this difference, these species require high resolution photos for differentiation between the two.
