= Polyphylla comes =

Scientific classification
- Kingdom: Animalia
- Phylum: Arthropoda
- Class: Insecta
- Order: Coleoptera
- Suborder: Polyphaga
- Infraorder: Scarabaeiformia
- Family: Scarabaeidae
- Genus: Polyphylla
- Species: P. comes

Binomial name
- Polyphylla comes Casey, 1914

Species of beetle

Polyphylla comes is a species of May beetle or junebug in the family Scarabaeidae. It is found in North America.
