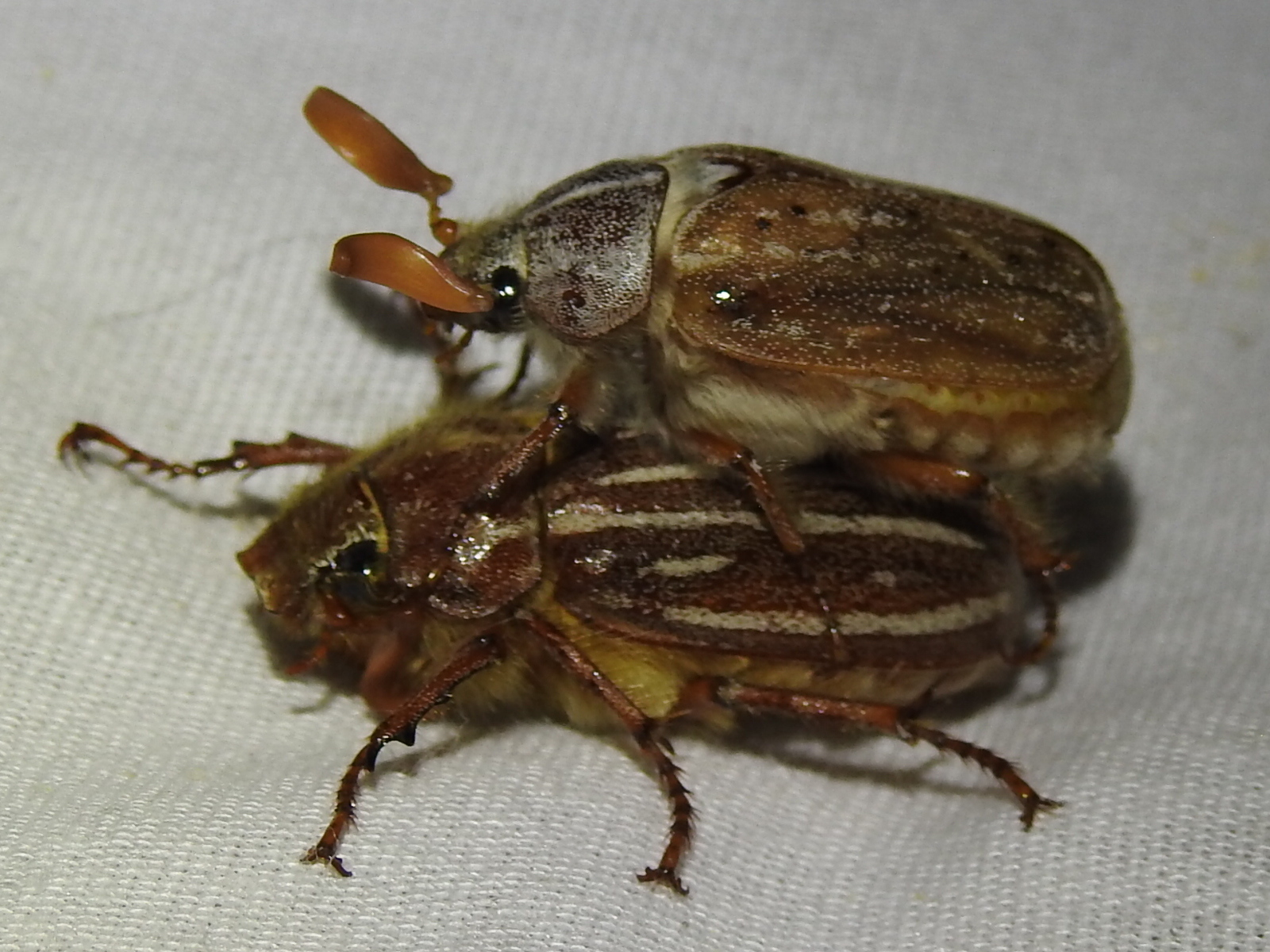

Scientific classification
- Kingdom: Animalia
- Phylum: Arthropoda
- Clade: Pancrustacea
- Class: Insecta
- Order: Coleoptera
- Suborder: Polyphaga
- Infraorder: Scarabaeiformia
- Family: Scarabaeidae
- Tribe: Melolonthini
- Genus: Polyphylla
- Species: P. pottsorum

Binomial name
- Polyphylla pottsorum Hardy, 1978

= Polyphylla pottsorum =

Species of beetle

Polyphylla pottsorum is a species of scarab beetle in the family Scarabaeidae. It is found in North America.
