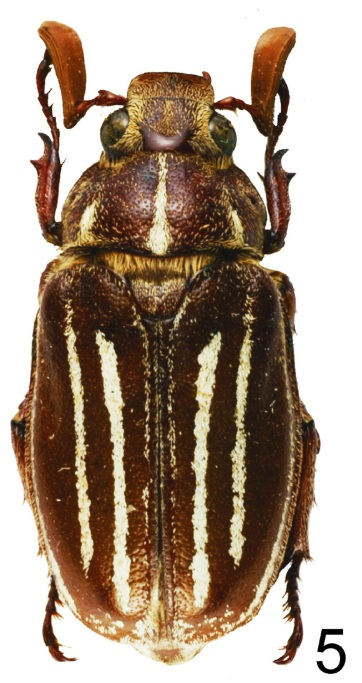

Scientific classification
- Kingdom: Animalia
- Phylum: Arthropoda
- Clade: Pancrustacea
- Class: Insecta
- Order: Coleoptera
- Suborder: Polyphaga
- Infraorder: Scarabaeiformia
- Family: Scarabaeidae
- Tribe: Melolonthini
- Genus: Polyphylla
- Species: P. minor

Binomial name
- Polyphylla minor Nomura, 1977

= Polyphylla minor =

Species of beetle

Polyphylla minor is a species of beetle of the family Scarabaeidae. It is found in China (Yunnan) and Taiwan.
