= Polyphylla donaldsoni =

Scientific classification
- Kingdom: Animalia
- Phylum: Arthropoda
- Clade: Pancrustacea
- Class: Insecta
- Order: Coleoptera
- Suborder: Polyphaga
- Infraorder: Scarabaeiformia
- Family: Scarabaeidae
- Tribe: Melolonthini
- Genus: Polyphylla
- Species: P. donaldsoni

Binomial name
- Polyphylla donaldsoni Skelley, 2003

Species of beetle

Polyphylla donaldsoni, or Donaldson's lined June beetle, is a species of scarab beetle in the family Scarabaeidae. It is found in North America, where it is only known from central Georgia.

== Description ==
Adults reach a length of about 16.5–21.5 mm (0.65–0.85 in). They are very similar to Polyphylla pubescens, but the antennae are pale brown, the punctures on the scutellum are widely scattered on the disc and the surface is mostly smooth and glossy. The elytra have a strong lateral margin.
