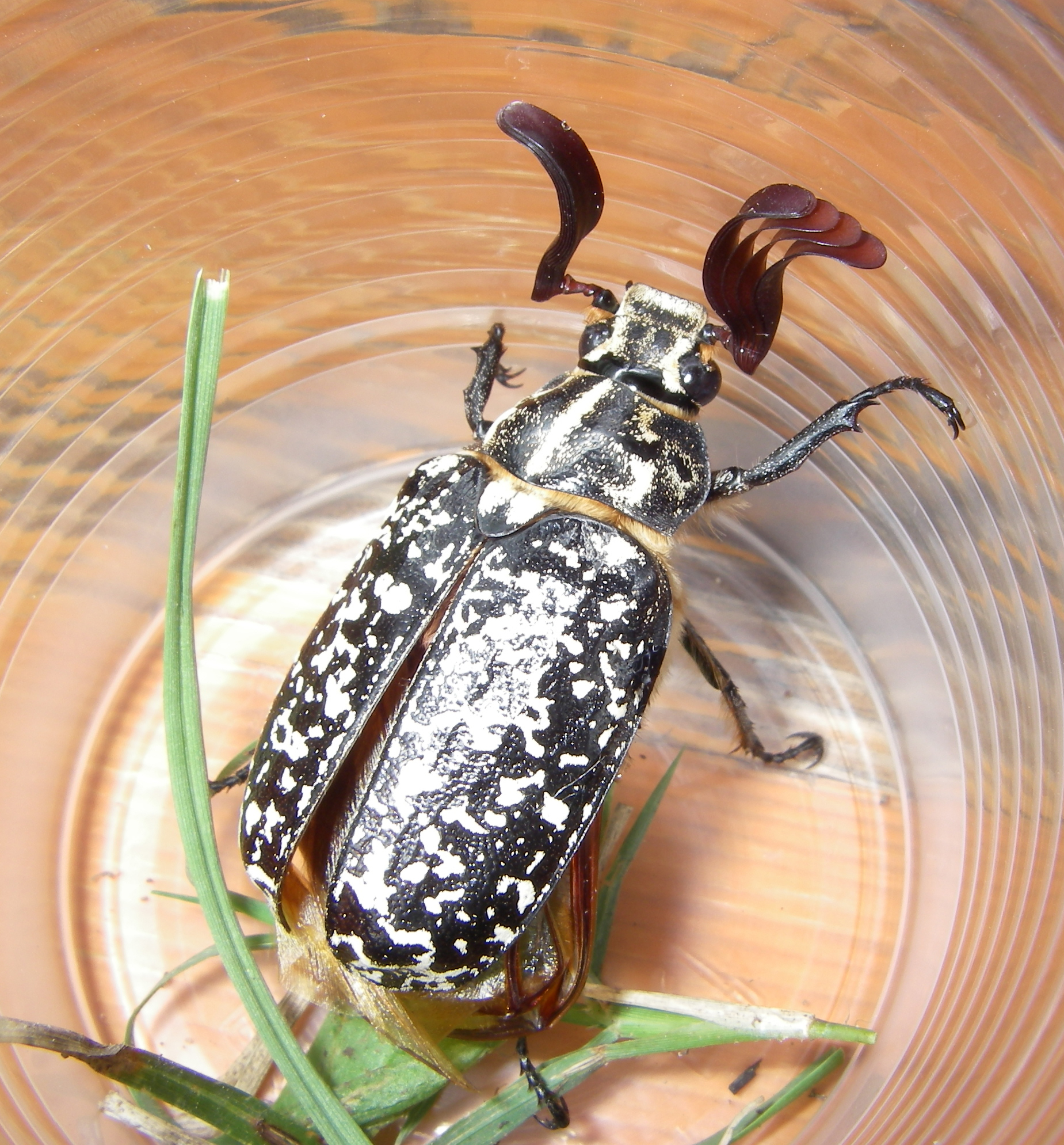
- Male

Scientific classification
- Kingdom: Animalia
- Phylum: Arthropoda
- Clade: Pancrustacea
- Class: Insecta
- Order: Coleoptera
- Suborder: Polyphaga
- Infraorder: Scarabaeiformia
- Family: Scarabaeidae
- Tribe: Melolonthini
- Genus: Polyphylla
- Species: P. fullo

Binomial name
- Polyphylla fullo (Linnaeus, 1758)

Audio

= Polyphylla fullo =

Species of beetle

Polyphylla fullo, the pine chafer, is a beetle belonging to the family Scarabaeidae, subfamily Melolonthinae.

== Description ==
Polyphylla fullo is the largest of the European Melolonthinae, attaining a length of 38 mm. The body is robust and convex and more or less reddish brown or blackish. It is covered with fine white pubescence which forms marbled spots. Like other members of the genus, males possess an enlarged antennal "fan", which gives a distinctive appearance to these beetles, and gave rise to the scientific name for the genus (Polyphylla = "many leaves"). The adult lives and feed on the foliage of pines, while the larvae live on the roots of grasses and sedges (Graminaceae and Cyperaceae).

== Distribution ==
Polyphylla fullo is found in North Africa, Europe and middle east. It occurs most frequently in central and southern Europe, but it is almost everywhere rare. Its northern boundary is the south of Sweden, the eastern Balkans, the Caucasus and east of Iran.

It inhabits sandy environments, such as the edge of a sunny pine forests, vineyards, or dunes.

== Gallery ==
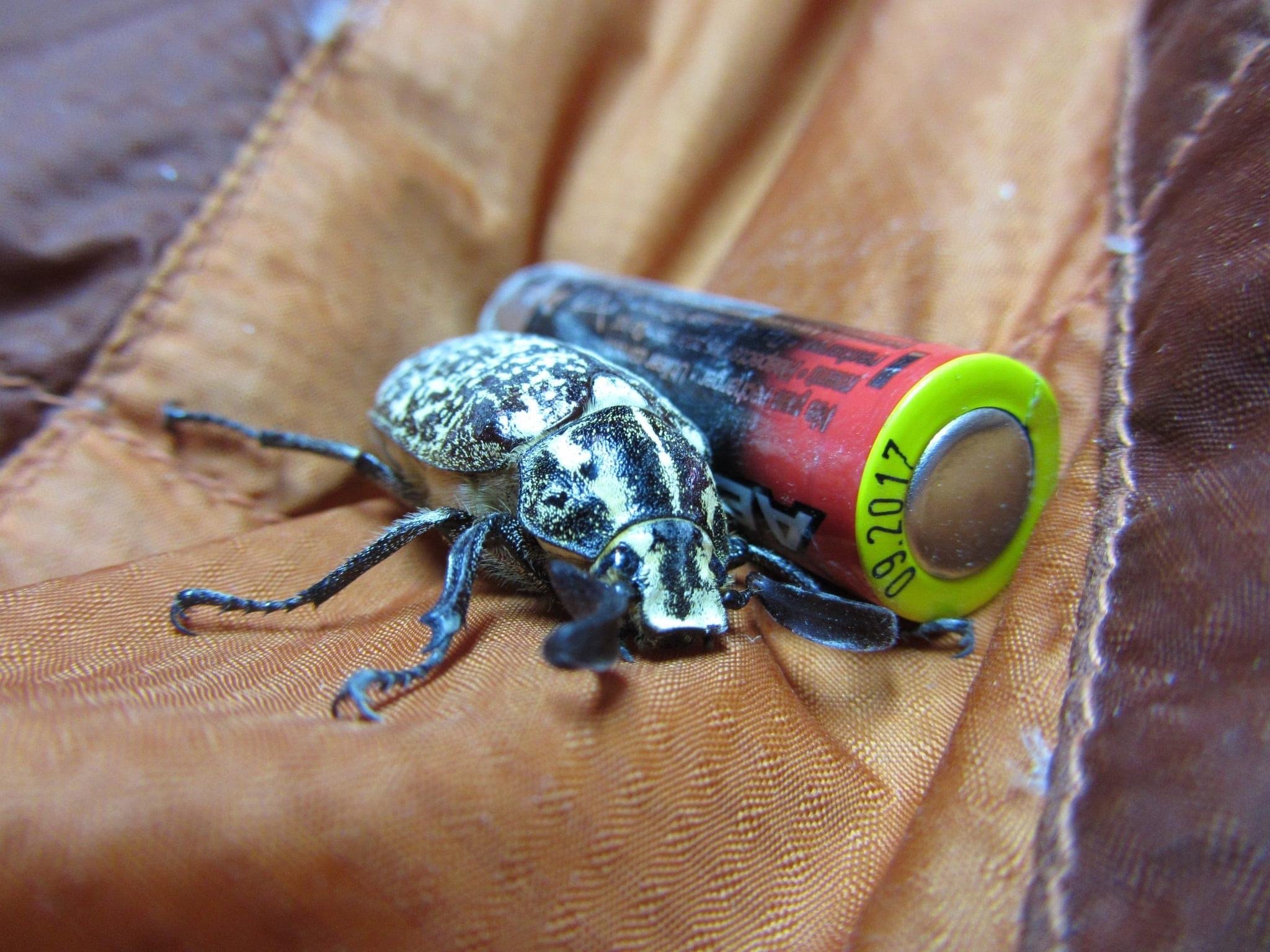
Polyphylla fullo next to a AA battery in Armenia

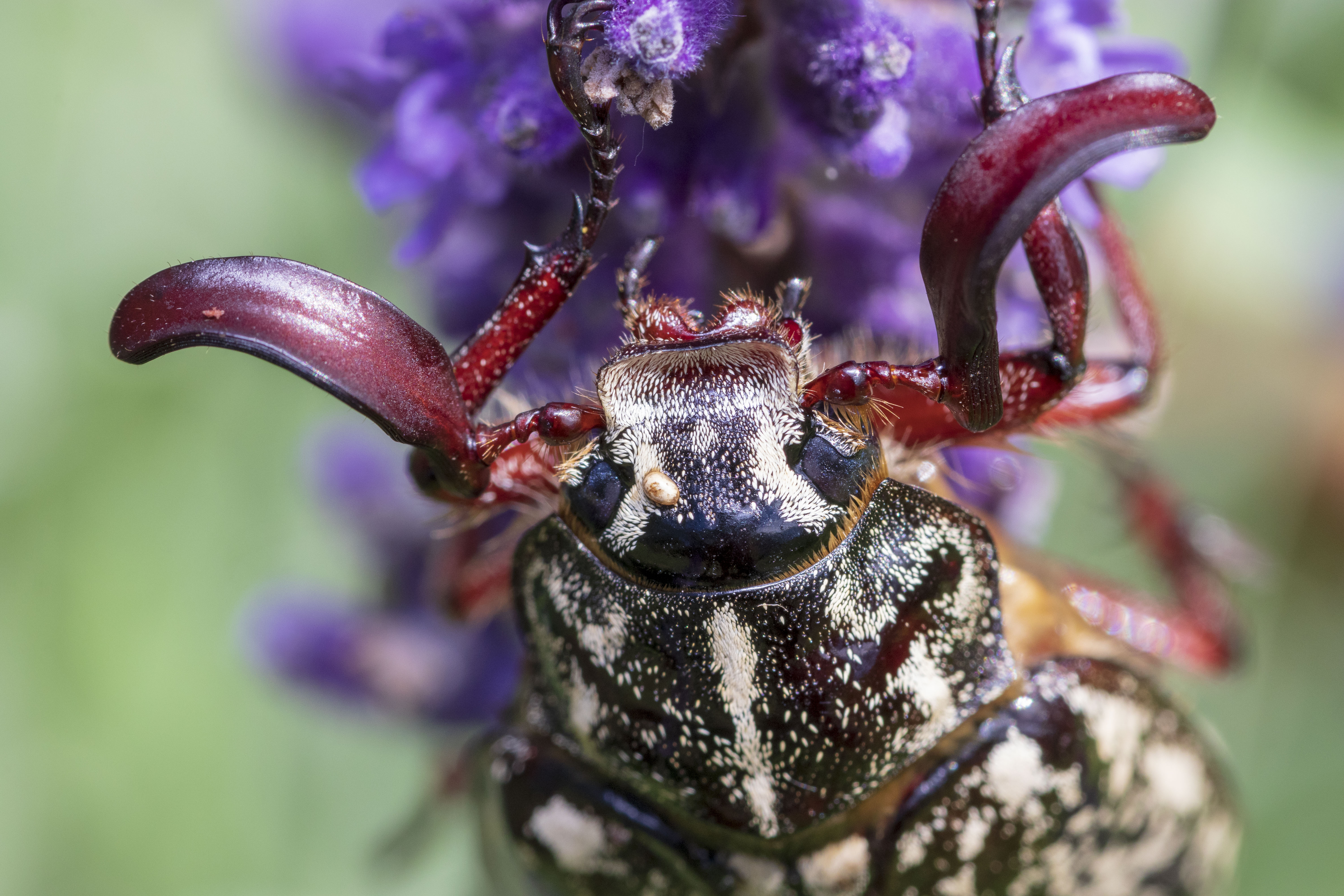
Polyphylla fullo head with antennas in "closed" position.

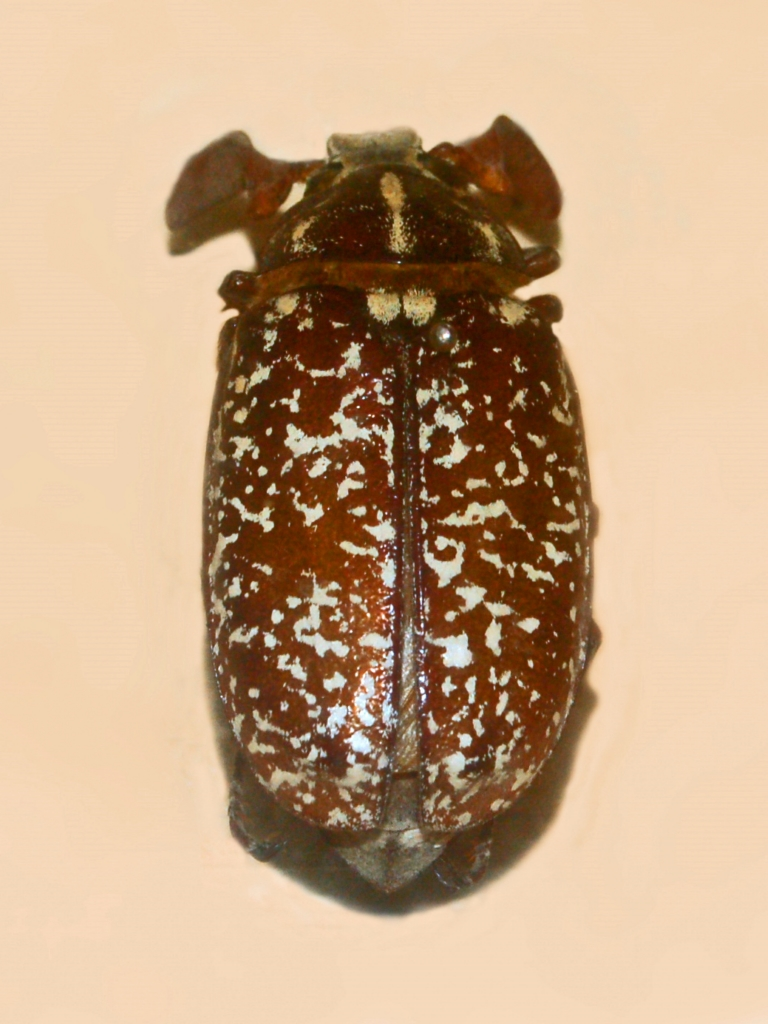
Polyphylla fullo, male. Mounted specimen

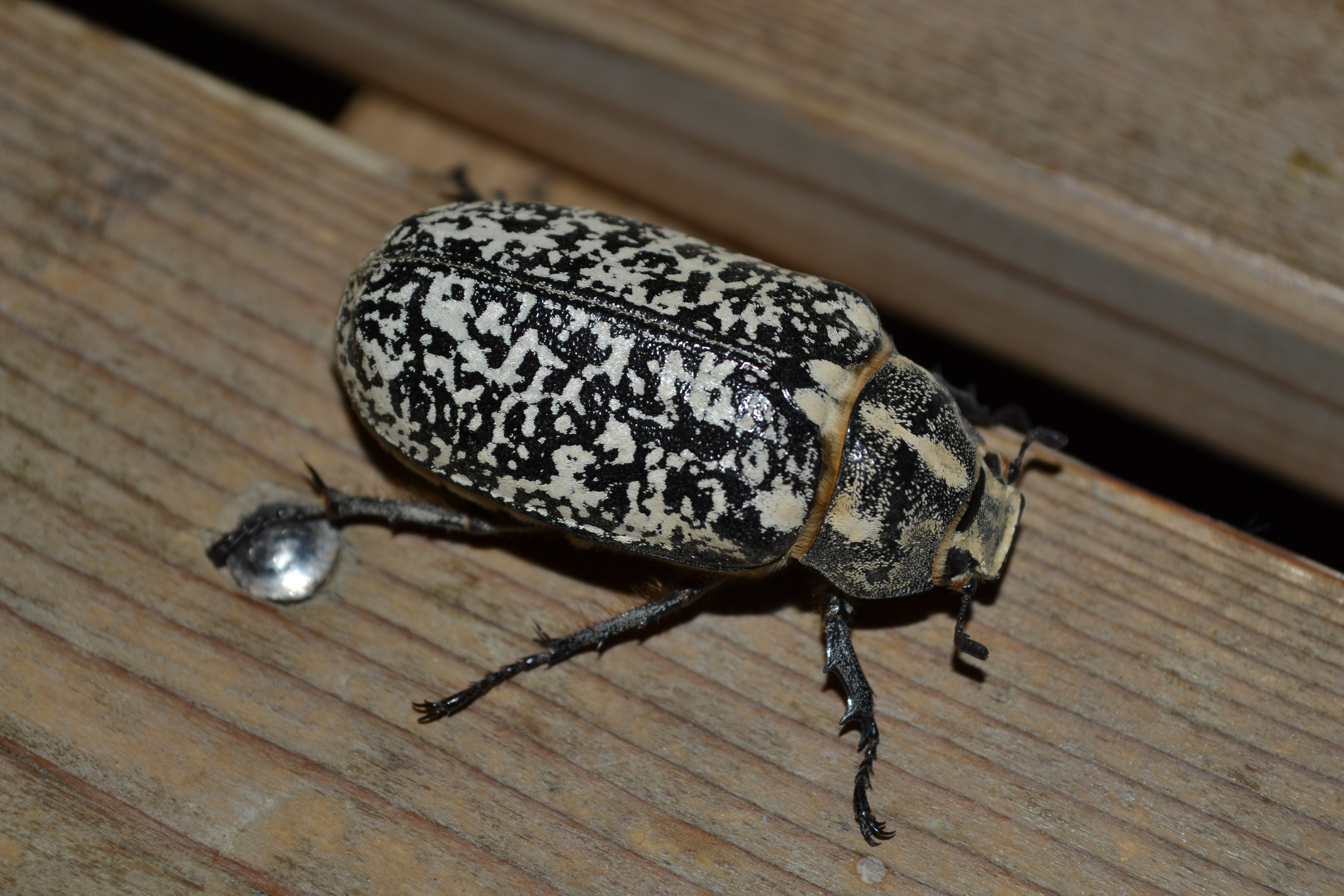
Female, in Provence, 2016

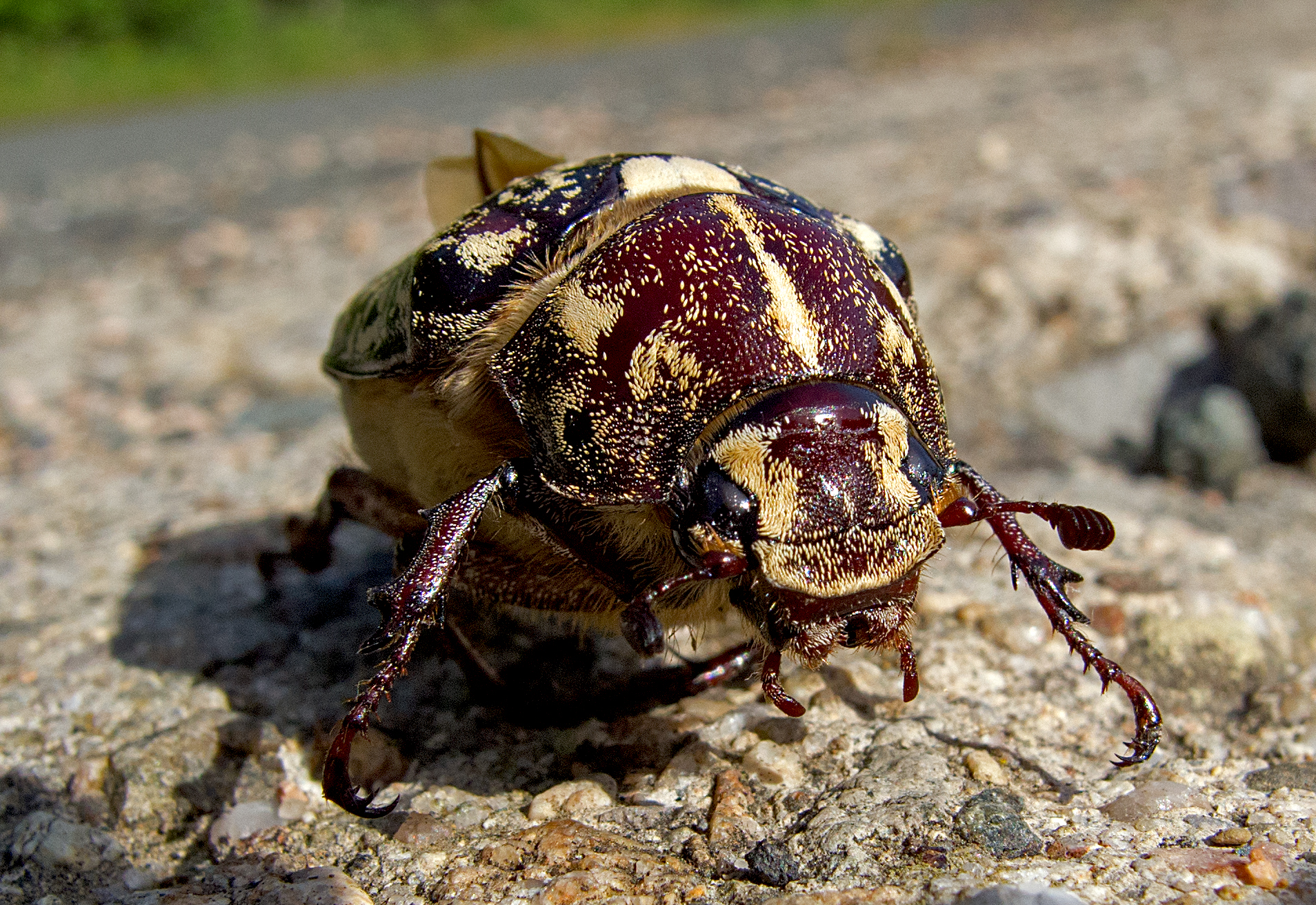
In Bulgaria, 2016

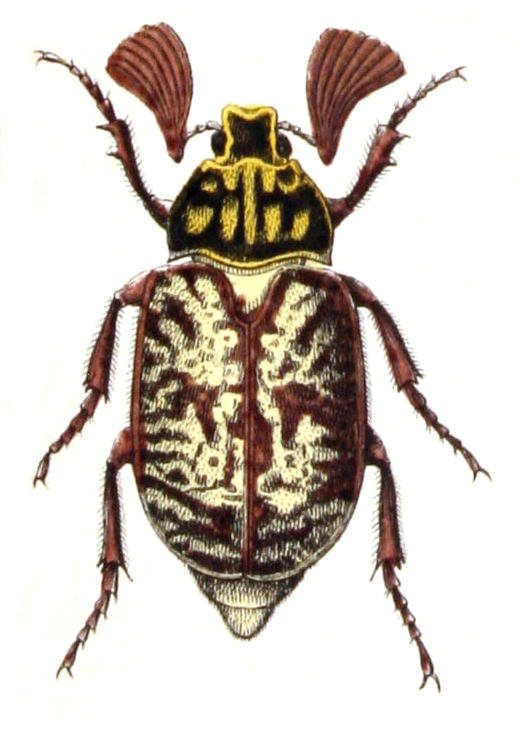
Illustration of a male of Polyphylla fullo from Calwer's Käferbuch, 1876

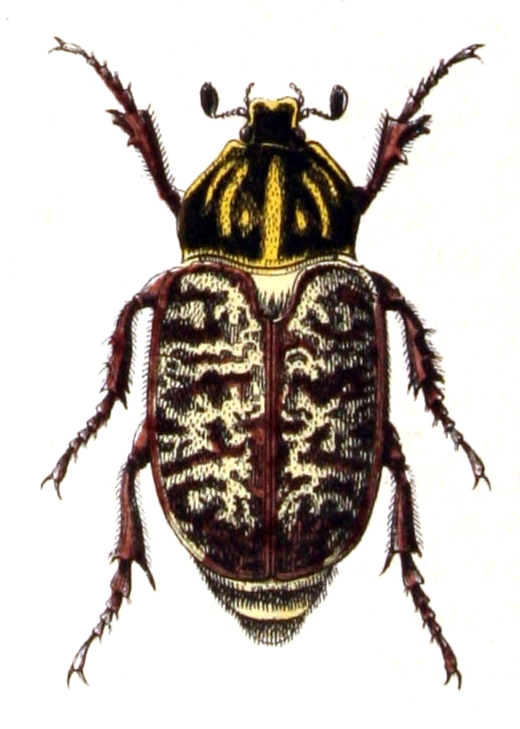
Illustration of a female of Polyphylla fullo from Calwer's Käferbuch, 1876
