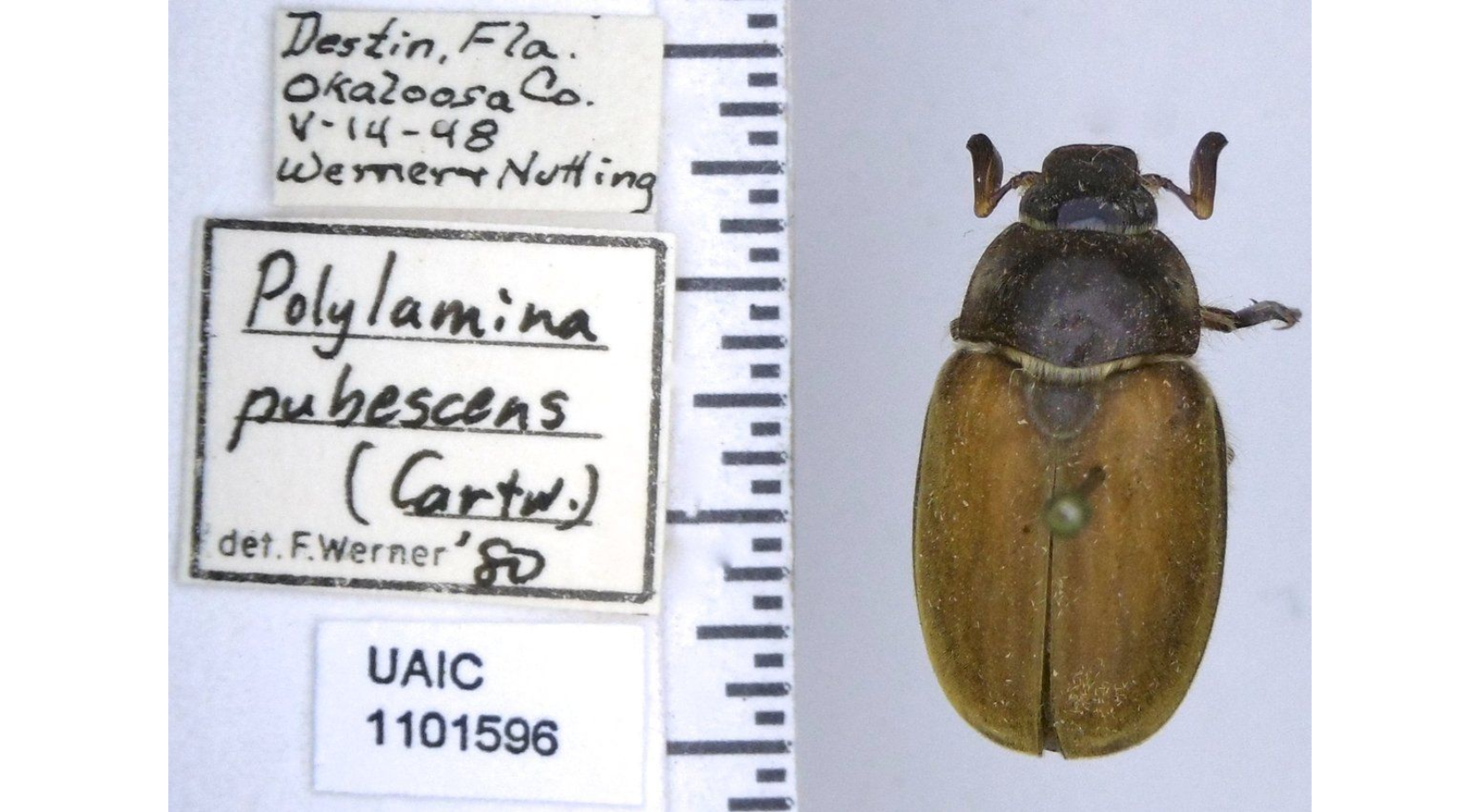

Scientific classification
- Kingdom: Animalia
- Phylum: Arthropoda
- Clade: Pancrustacea
- Class: Insecta
- Order: Coleoptera
- Suborder: Polyphaga
- Infraorder: Scarabaeiformia
- Family: Scarabaeidae
- Tribe: Melolonthini
- Genus: Polyphylla
- Species: P. pubescens

Binomial name
- Polyphylla pubescens Cartwright, 1939

= Polyphylla pubescens =

Species of beetle

Polyphylla pubescens, the Eglin uplands scarab beetle, is a species of beetle of the family Scarabaeidae. It is found in Florida, where it is only known from the area inland on or near Eglin Airforce Base.

== Description ==
Adults reach a length of about 17.5–19 mm (0.69–0.75 in) (males) and about 19–20 mm (0.75–0.79 in) (females). They may be distinguished from related species by the strong lateral elytral margin reaching the base.
