= Dietary biology of the tawny owl =

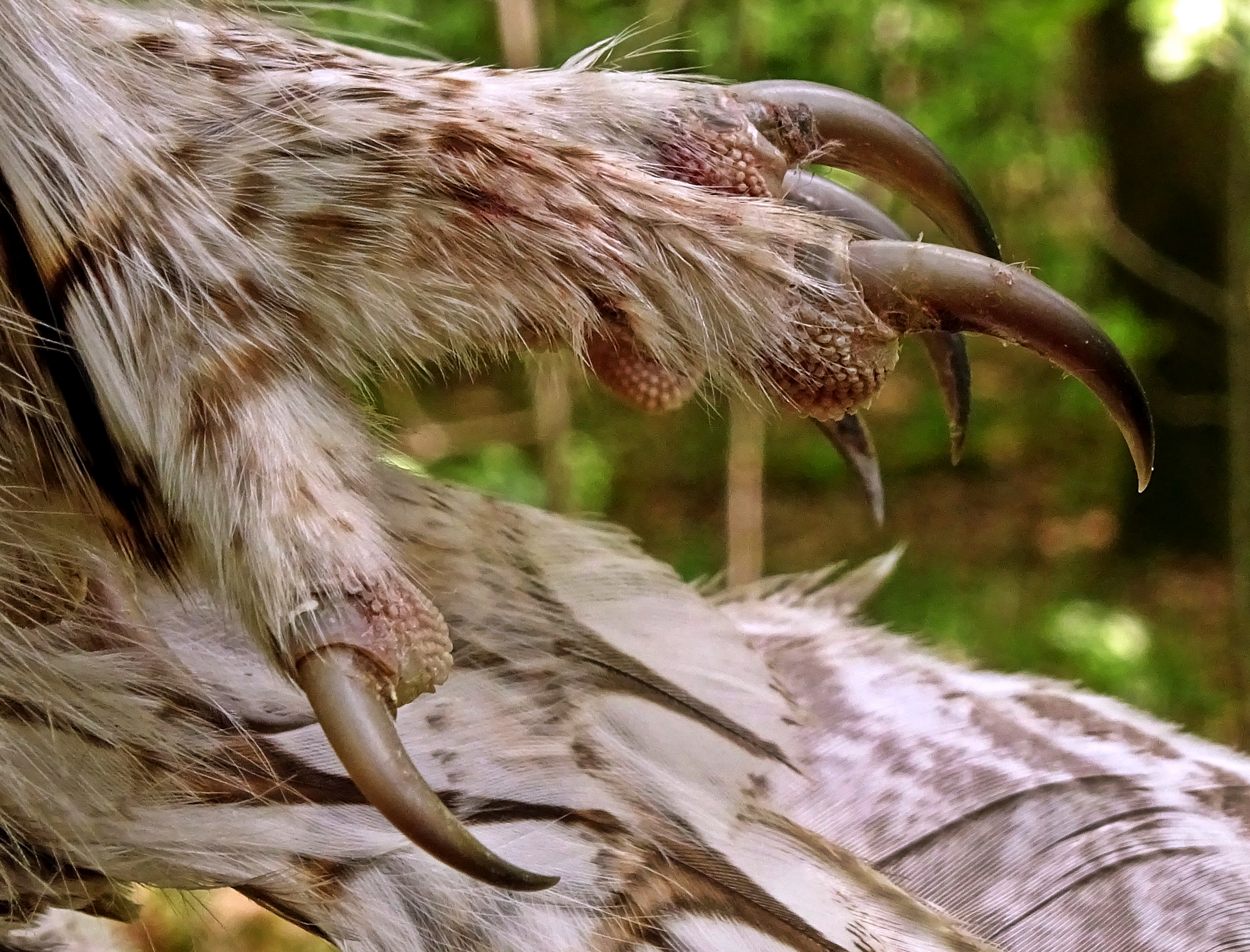
The fairly powerful talons of a tawny owl.

The tawny owl (Strix aluco) is an opportunistic and generalized predator. Peak hunting activity tends to occur largely between dusk to midnight, with owls often following an erratic hunting pattern, perhaps to sites where previous hunts were successful. When feeding young, hunting may need to be prolonged into daylight in the early morning. Based on hand-reared young owls that re-released into the wild, hunting behaviour is quite innate rather than learned. Normally this owl hunts from a perch. Perching bouts usually last from about 8 to 14 minutes depending largely on habitat. Tawny owl's hunting from a perch or pole can recall a buzzard and the two take similar prey sizes as well. However, high initial speed and maneuvering among trees and bushes with great dexterity may allow it to surprise relatively large prey, more like a goshawk. The tawny owl is capable of lifting and carrying off in flight individual prey weighing up to at least 320 g (11 oz). Their middle talon, the most enlarged claw on owls, measures an average of 19.1 mm (0.75 in). While not as large as those of the Ural owl, the talons are extremely sharp, stout and quite decurved. The claws are considered to be visibly more overdeveloped than those of other European mid-sized owls and the footspan including the claws is somewhat larger as well, at an average of about 13.4 cm (5.3 in). The hunting owl often extends its wings to balance and control prey upon impact. Alternatively, this species may hunt from flight. This occurs from 2 to 3 m (6.6 to 9.8 ft) over the ground, often over open habitats such as bushes, marsh or grassland, forming a quartering or zigzag pattern over the opening. During these flights they cover about 30 to 50 m (98 to 164 ft) before changing direction. Hunting from flight was surprisingly prevalent in a Swedish study of two radio-tagged birds, with 34% of study time spent hunting from flight while 40% of the study time was spent on hunting from a perch. In a similar study in England, less than 1% of time was spent hunting from flight. In a more deliberate variation of hunting from flight, the hunting owl may examine crags and nest boxes or also hover around prey roosts. In the latter type of hunts, the tawny owls may strike branches and/or beat their wings together in front of denser foliage, bushes or conifers in order to disturb and flush prey such as small birds and bats, or may dive directly into said foliage. Hovering has also been recorded in differing circumstances, including one incidence of an owl hunting a small bird that was caught on the wing after a hovering flight. Tawny owls have also taken bats on the wing as well (such as ones snatched from near streep lamps when attempting to hunt themselves) and have been seen to hawk large, relatively slow-flying insects such as some beetles and moths in flight. Caterpillars may too be taken from trees. Usually these hunting variations are correlated with poor weather hampering the capture of preferred prey. Tawny owls eat worms with relative frequency, as they often hear them apparently from below the surface and snatch them up from shallow dirt or below leaf litter. Their worm-hunting style recalls worm hunting techniques by most other birds and they were recorded to eat 0.39 worms per minute during an hour of observation in England and were sometimes seen to feed on worms during daylight. Other hunting from the ground has been observed, often of insects such as beetles, but tawny owls have also been reported to "leap" upon from a ground vantage point in order to capture a vole, quite like foxes often do. There are now many accounts of tawny owls feeding on carrion from a wide range of sources, including hares, rats, sheep, and trout.

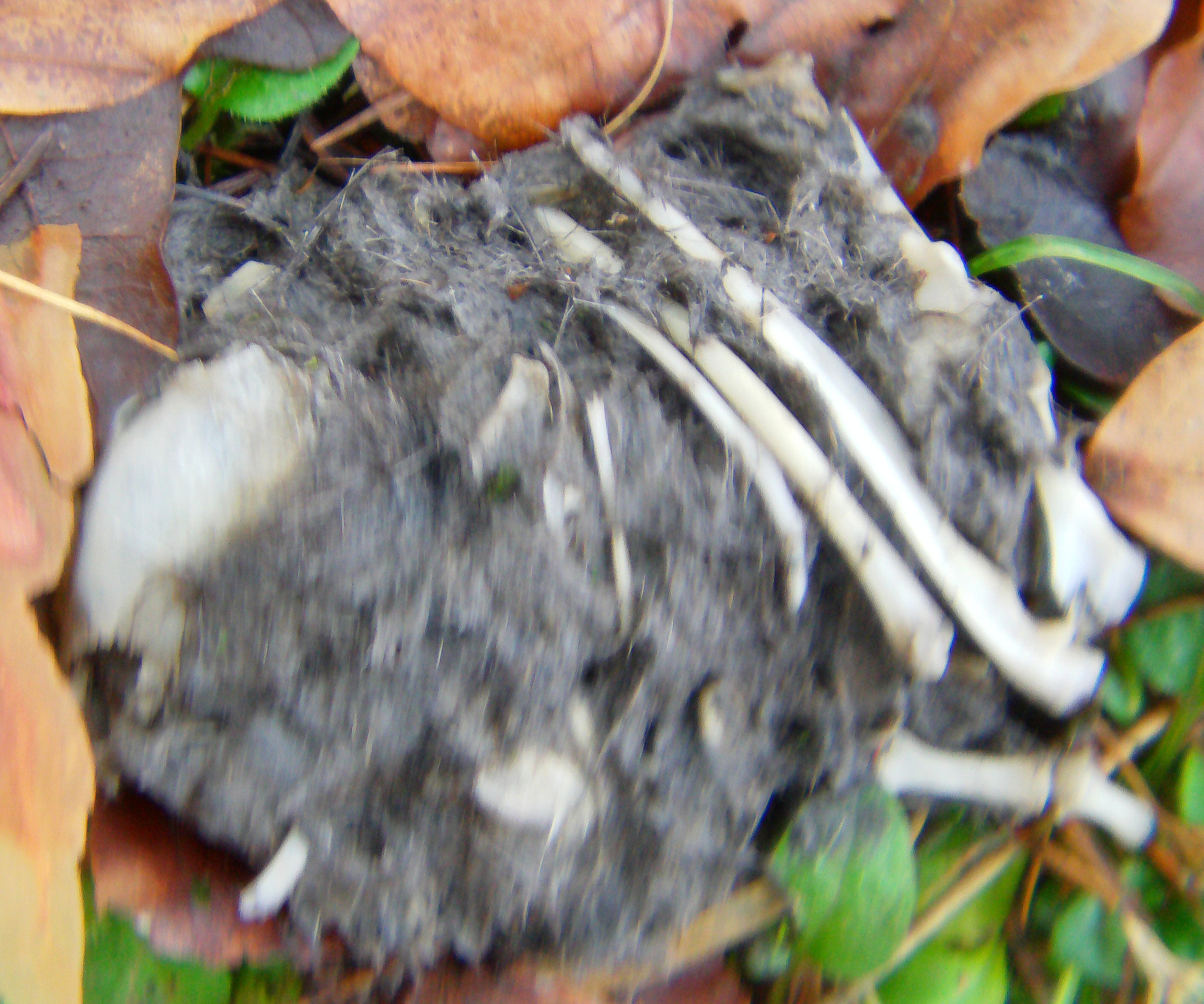
A partially dissected pellet of a tawny owl.

Upon capture, small prey like shrews and rodents are often swallowed whole, while others may be torn into pieces. Often prey is dismembered in order to more easily ingest it whole, i.e. decapitating mice, removing the legs from frogs while birds like sparrows are also regularly decapitated (with the head often eaten separately) and nearly all avian prey is plucked before being consumed. One tawny owl was observed to eat a squirrel by leaving the head intact and peeling the skin back from the neck, apparently leaving bones in place while consuming the flesh. Indigestible items, including fur, feathers, bones (which sometimes visibly protrude out of the peller), sometimes intestines and invertebrate carapaces, are regurgitated in large pellets, that can be anywhere in typical size from 20.3 to 67 mm (0.80 to 2.64 in) long with a diameter of 17 to 30 mm (0.67 to 1.18 in). The pellets are typically grey coloured and are found in groups under trees used for roosting or nesting. At least some tawny owl pellets can measure up to 84 mm (3.3 in) long and can include large objects such as an intact 10 cm (3.9 in) bill of a snipe. Undigested material coughed up often reveals different prey than pellets. Estimated daily food requirements for a tawny owl is 73.5 g (2.59 oz), which is proportionately lower (at about 14% of their own body mass) than the estimates for other medium-sized owls in Europe (at 23–26% of their own body mass), therefore tawny owls can appear to live off of relatively little food quite efficiently.

== Prey spectrum ==
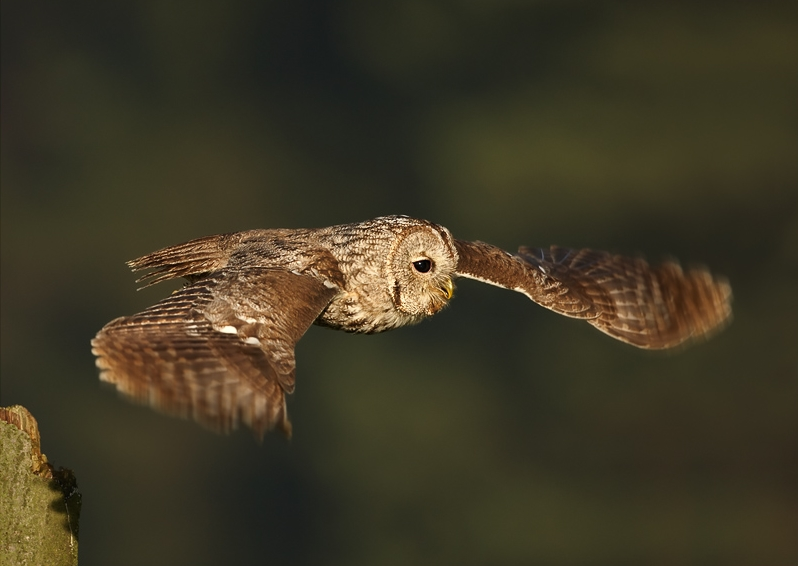
Tawny owls are largely perch hunters but can be surprisingly agile while hunting in flight.

The tawny owl takes an extremely wide range of prey species. The global prey spectrum for tawny owls includes well over 400 prey species. They generally prefer small mammals in their diet, especially various species of rodent, where they are available. However, they are one are the least specialized owls in Europe when it comes to prey selection and can broadly be described as extremely opportunistic. Tawny owls respond to access of prey concentrations of virtually any variety, including birds, amphibians and insects as well as sometimes reptiles and fish, by taking them in large numbers, sometimes equal or even (more infrequently) greater numbers than mammalian prey. The difference between the generalist tawny owl and a specialized rodent-hunter like the long-eared owl was illustrated in a semi-captive experience where the two owl species were exposed to different classes of wild prey as they encountered it. In this experiment, only small mammals and roosting sparrows were attacked and eaten by both, though flying sparrows were avoided by long-eared owls and not by the tawnys. In the stated study, the tawny owls would kill and eat amphibians and fish, while the long-eared owls would rarely kill and never eat these types of prey. In a study of five European biomes, with about 45 prey species per biome, the tawny owl was estimated to have tied for the second most prey species per biome after the Eurasian eagle-owl (Bubo bubo). Another European study found the mean food niche breadth, i.e. the estimated average by number of prey species per nest or study site, the tawny owl surpassed all European owls within two of the three main regions of non-British Europe, with 5.84 mean food niche breadth in central Europe and 4.3 food niche breadth in the Mediterranean region. In the latter study, the eagle-owl food niche breadth was listed as 2.4 and 3.3 in these regions, respectively (tawny owls were excluded from analysis in the Scandivanian region due to their marginal range there). The tawny owl mostly focuses on fairly small-sized prey. One estimation of the mean prey size taken in all of Europe for the tawny owl was 34.5 g (1.22 oz). In northern and central Europe, older studies place the mean prey size taken as usually between 29 and 40 g (1.0 and 1.4 oz). Another study, of the aforementioned 5 European biomes, showed a drastically lower mean estimated prey size of 18.6 g (0.66 oz), even slightly lower than the mean prey size taken by an owl like the Eurasian pygmy owl (Glaucidium passerinum), which weighs about one-eighth as much as tawny owl. Individual dietary studies show that the mean prey mass taken by tawny owls can vary from 12.6 to 130 g (0.44 to 4.59 oz) depending on prey access. A central Italian study showed how habitat type and resulting prey composition can vary mean prey size considerably, with broadleaf highland forest having a mean prey mass of 26.6 g (0.94 oz), mixed forest having a mean mass of 37.7 g (1.33 oz), urban areas having a mean prey mass of 40.3 g (1.42 oz) and coppice woodland having a high mean prey mass of 73.1 g (2.58 oz).

== Mammals ==
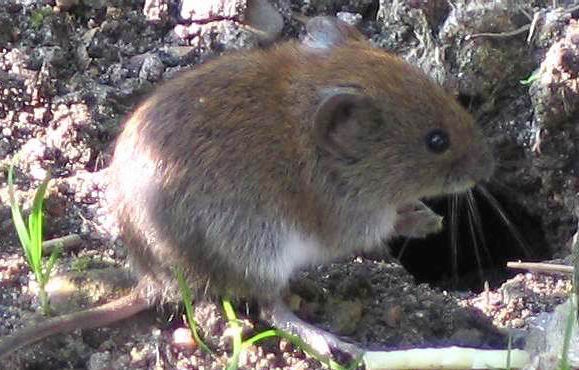
The bank vole is a common prey.

Tawny owls will potentially take any small mammals that they encounter. This was illustrated in Poland where the number of species taken by the owls was greater than the number of species biologists could capture themselves. They primarily take and derive most of their food energy from rodent prey. Dietary staples in much of their range are in particular the long-tailed Apodemus, commonly called field or wood mice, and the short-tailed rodents known as voles. Amongst voles, the widely distributed bank vole (Myodes glareolus) tends to be the most favored type over large portions of the range, though different species of the Microtus genus can become locally rather prominent. Microtus voles tend to forage in more open habitats such as fields than do the wooded edge-favoring bank vole and especially Apodemus mice, and so are usually selected more so where the preferred rodent types are rare or absent. Previous studies claimed that Apodemus mice were preferred where available over bank voles as the latter was considered "somewhat diurnal", however bank voles like many voles are more correctly considered cathemeral, potentially active any time of day or night, and may actually be readily accessible to hunting tawny owls. However, the bank voles favoring of heavier ground cover does limit access to them in the warmer months, whereas Apodemus mice are more likely to continue forage on open ground adjacent to woods and tend to be preferred at this time. It was found that bank voles become more vulnerable to tawny owls in areas where enlarged deer herds consume more of the ground cover. A broad study of different nations within central Europe found that Apodemus mice and bank voles could alternately take the primary food mantle, and that the variation of which was favorite was likely due to differing habitat and forest composition characteristics in the given regions.

In Finland, bank and Microtus voles were taken more or less in equivalent occurrence to their observed populations in the field. Similarly, in Poland, they took yellow-necked mice (Apodemus flavicollis) adults roughly in proportion to their occurrence in the wild. On the other hand, per the Polish study, juvenile yellow-necks were taken much less and subadults much more than their occurrence in the wild. Here, the tawny owls took slightly larger specimens on average than the average recorded in wild, at an estimated mean size taken of 34 g (1.2 oz). In a study from Denmark, yellow-necked mice and bank voles that were caught by tawny owls were disproportionately large, adult males (55% and 73% of the time, respectively). In central Lithuania, tawny and long-eared owls took common voles (Microtus arvalis) than were 24% heavier on average than those encountered in the wild, which averaged 16.45 g (0.580 oz) (thus including younger voles). More surprisingly, the long-eared owls were taking voles averaging some 9% larger than those taken by tawny owls. Wild mice, bank voles and, to a more pronounced extent, Microtus voles undergo population cycles over a three-year (or sometimes four-year) span, which frequently requires the owls to alternate their foods when populations decline. This effect was studied in the British Kielder Forest and the nearby Kershope Burn. Here tawny owls are exceptionally dependent on field voles (Microtus agretis) as food, constituting about 64.3% of 1220 prey items in the area, but the Kielder forest field vole population had an exceptional four-year drought whereas in the same time frame Kershope kept a more stable owl population seemingly because it retained the typical three-year cycle. In Wytham, Britain, tawnys were thought to remove up to one-third of the local population of bank voles and one-third to three-quarters of the less numerous wood mouse (Apodemus sylvatica). On a 148 ha (370 acres) plot of Wielkopolska, tawny owls are thought to remove an estimated 2,213 rodents annually, or 15 rodents per ha each year, which was about the same rate of loss of striped field mouse (Apodemus agrarius) per ha in the Warsaw area as well. In Białowieża Forest, tawny owls were estimated to remove in autumn 54% of the yellow-necked mice and 40% of bank voles.

In the largest known European diet studies, rodents usually are predominant. Amongst 68,070 prey items in Slovakia, the main prey were the yellow-necked mouse (23.8%), the bank vole (9.9%) and the common vole (9.14%). In the Czech Republic, the same three main prey species led the foods amongst 17,433 prey items, with the yellow-necked at 33.4%, the common vole at 15.7% and the bank vole at 11.2%. Among prey groups in Grunewald, Germany, with 13,359 vertebrate prey items studied, Apodemus species made up 25.7% of the foods and Microtus voles of about four species made up a further 16.7%. The diet differed in the German area of Herrnut, where the common vole was dominant in the foods at 53.3% of 8513 prey items. In a little over half of about 15 smaller prey studies for tawny owls in Poland, mammals led the food composition of owls by number, but in different areas and habitats of the nation, yellow-necked mice, common voles and bank voles could be at the top of the list. Of 43,000 mammal prey items in an older large study of central Europe, 66% were bank or Microtus voles, while a further 24% were Apodemus species. In Bourgogne-Franche-Comté, France, amongst 51,743 prey items, Apodemus species, presumably dominated by the wood mouse, made up 51.1% by number and 48.8% of the biomass followed by bank vole, at 20.4% by number and 15.6% by biomass. In western Switzerland, the diet was similar but far more homogeneous, with Apodemus species at 74.3% and bank vole at 18.7% among 10,176 prey items.

The northernmost food study for tawny owls thus far conducted showed that in Sweden, field voles were the main food amongst 578 prey items, at 30.5%, with bank voles being supplemental at 8.7%. However, the second most commonly taken prey in Sweden is the much larger European water vole (Arvicola amphibius), which weighs an estimated mean of 177 g (6.2 oz), and presumably a very nutritious prey resource to these owls. The easternmost food study thus far known was a small one of 201 prey items for the tawny owls in Moscow, wherein the common vole was dominant at 72.6%. Of similar longitude, in the Caucasus, amongst 1236 prey items, the main foods were Ural field mouse (Apodemus uralensis) at 48.1% of the prey composition and edible dormouse (Glis glis) at 15%. The tawny owl takes many species of dormouse, which are nocturnal, largely arboreal and generally rarer within the forests and edges than common mice and vole prey. While many dormice are smallish (roughly vole or mouse sized), the edible species is often more than five times larger, being close in dimensions to the European water vole. Therefore, the prey biomass must have been hearty in Montenegro, where the edible dormouse was the main food, at 24.1% of 529 prey items. Other more easterly parts of Europe show relatively high balances of edible dormice as well, such as in Bulgaria, Romania and Slovenia. Another widely taken species is the hazel dormouse (Muscardinus avellanarius), as well as at least three further species. Another rodent of special interest due to its natural scarcity and its place in the diet of tawny owls is the northern birch mouse (Sicista betulina), which was found to constitute as much as 7% of the foods in some districts of Lithuania, but only contributed 0.6% of the foods overall in the country.

All told, no less than 80 rodent species are known to be taken by tawny owls. While most of these are characteristic prey such as various voles and lemmings and any type of murid rodent from the smallest available mice to the largest available rats, other rodents also taken. Black rats (Rattus rattus) were noted to be the main prey for tawny owls in Sicily, where they accounted for 35.3% by number of 351 prey items and 60.2% of the biomass, resulting in a relative high mean prey mass of 79.7 g (2.81 oz) here. Strong biomass contributions were noted of brown rats (Rattus norvegicus) elsewhere such as in Lublin in Poland (wherein they accounted for 41.5% of the biomass) and in Algeria (wherein they accounted for about 20% of the biomass), although many rats taken are on the young side rather than large adults, especially of the large brown species. The tawny owl's prey spectrum also extends to less accessible prey like squirrels (including ground squirrels), with more or less all the species of Europe and western Asia known to be taken by these owls despite their diurnality, as well as the nocturnal but scarce flying squirrels. The widespread red squirrel (Sciurus vulgaris), estimated to weigh an average of 150 to 300 g (5.3 to 10.6 oz) when taken, appear to recognize the tawny owl as a serious threat, with ones exposed to recordings of their calls recorded to interrupt feedings, engage in rapid movements and scold harshly. Hamsters may too be taken despite favoring and occurring in more open habitats than those usually hunted by tawny owls. In the southerly parts of the range, as they've acclimated to semi-desert, tawny owls can sometimes partially off of quite different murid rodents like jirds and gerbils as well as the non-murid blind mole rats. Rodent prey may range up to the size of probable juveniles of the non-native nutria (Myocastor coypus).

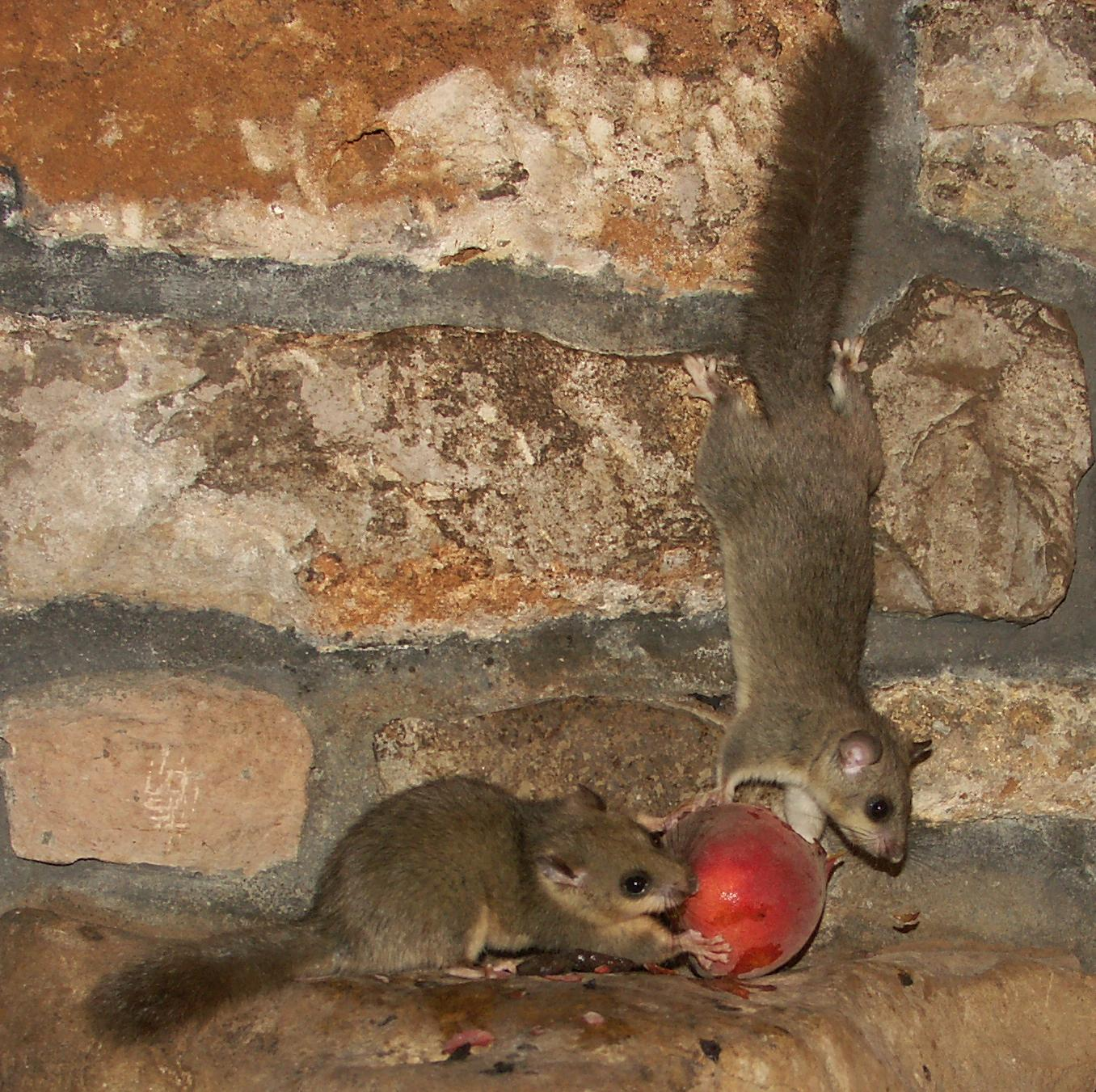
Large prey for tawny owls can extend commonly in some areas to edible dormice.

Shrews are a common component of the foods of tawny owls, less so their larger but generally less numerous distant cousins such as moles and hedgehogs. More than 20 species of shrew are known in the foods of this owl. While usually secondary, shrews are widely present in the pellets and prey remains in most studies. Unlike some owls such as long-eared owls they do not seem to disdain these musky-tasting and slight insectivores. Certainly the most reported variety would be the widespread common shrew (Sorex araneus). Exceptionally, in a large food study for Belgium, common shrews were the leading prey species, at 18.2% of 15,450 prey items. In a much smaller study in Norway during the summer, the common shrew was the leading prey species, constituting 30.4% of 69 prey items. However, given their small size, with the common shrew being one of the larger available species at merely 8 to 11 g (0.28 to 0.39 oz), shrews are a marginal contributor to the owl's prey biomass and taken for subsistence until a more substantial food source is available. Exceptional quantities of shrews may be predicted in French studies (usually during preferred prey shortages), with shrew prey contributing up to 15% of the biomass overall and more locally, in the Oignies, to 29% of the biomass. Despite the low numbers of moles that are usually hunted, species such as the European mole (Talpa europaea) can be contribute heartily to the prey biomass, such as in Wytham, where the species made up 15.6% of the biomass. Although such prey is known to be relatively limited in the species' foods, tawny owls are known to hunt the smallest living mammal species (by weight), the 1.8 g (0.063 oz) Etruscan shrew (Suncus etruscus), up to the size of the largest mole, the 440 g (16 oz) Russian desman (Desmana moschata), as well as perhaps larger still, some small adults of the European hedgehog (Erinaceus europaeus).

On occasion, tawny owls will prey on young European rabbits (Oryctolagus cuniculus) as well as very young hares. Mostly neonatal or scarcely older rabbits are taken, with a few studies estimating the mean weight as caught as only 100 to 350 g (3.5 to 12.3 oz). Access to European rabbit was said to cause the mean prey mass of tawny owls in parts of the Netherlands to an unprecedentedly high 130 g (4.6 oz). One Spanish study claimed that up to 23% of the vertebrate prey for the tawny owl was made up of by rabbits, making them the smallest known avian predator to show a dependence on them. Though generally a minor part of the diet, a wide diversity of bats are taken by tawny owls, with over 30 species in their prey spectrum. Usually less than 1% of vertebrate prey consists of bats but in Poland, dietary relations have been studied between tawny owls living near bat caves and urban bat roosts, and locally up to as much as 2% of the diet (and 5.3% of the mammalian foods) can consist of bats. Studies have indicated that bat species are more or less hunted in proportion to their occurrence in mixed colonies and are taken more so within urbanized environments as well as when staple rodent prey is low. In Austria, 252 attacks by tawny owls were recorded at a colony of Geoffroy's bats (Myotis emarginatus), 31 of which were successful. In Great Britain, it is estimated that tawny owls eliminate at minimum 140,000 individual bats annually. While most bats encountered (and hunted) are fairly small-bodied, tawny owls may hunt bats of all sizes available, from the roughly 4 g (0.14 oz) common pipistrelle (Pipistrellus pipistrellus) to the 59 g (2.1 oz) greater noctule (Nyctalus lasiopterus) in Europe and to the 140 g (4.9 oz) Egyptian fruit bat (Rousettus aegyptiacus) outside of Europe. Other mammalian prey recorded have been mustelids. The tawny owl is known to hunt both common weasels in Europe, including fairly large stoats (Mustela erminea), weighing averages of up to 200 to 300 g (7.1 to 10.6 oz), despite the potential risk of counterattacking by these bold and powerful hunters. Traces of an even bigger mustelid have been found, the European pine marten (Martes martes), in the foods of tawny owls, though it is a considerable possibility that this was scavenged rather than killed by the owl, much like the verified case of tawny owls scavenging remains of European polecats (Mustela putorius).

== Birds ==
Tawny owls do not take birds as commonly as mammals. Unlike the unrelated lineages of diurnal birds of prey, owls in general seldom prefer avian prey, with most varieties preferring small mammals and/or insects, except on a local basis (the closest to a specialized hunter of other birds are some in the pygmy owl genus). Tawny owls do opportunistically hunt birds through most of the range, however. When it comes to avian prey, there is little evidence that any particular kind is sought out and the owls are likely to randomly come across other birds as an alternate food choice. Usually, European studies show that birds normally constitute less than 15% of the total foods of this owl. In central Europe within an older study, 6000 bird prey (or a little less than 10% of the recorded prey) items were recorded of nearly 100 species, 33% of which were sparrows. When capturing avian prey, the tawny owls not only pluck the prey but also often decapitate and inflict fairly extensive skeletal damage, especially when the victim is a relatively large bird. When a population of great (Parus major) and Eurasian blue tits (Cyanistes caeruleus) was artificially increased by researchers in the vicinity of tawny owl nests, it was found that, despite the tits not being common food, the owls did reduce the population of increased tit. Many more tits were taken during snow cover or while incubating, with male tits being often being taken in larger numbers, and tit numbers were further reduced when fewer rodents were available. In Gothenburg, Sweden, on 26 tawny territories the diversity of songbird species was higher (at 12.83 average species) inside tawny territories than outside (10.3 species). Attempts to study whether songbirds were significant in the foods found that bird altogether amounted to 6.78% of the total prey numbers (most likely to be thrushes), so were not significantly effected here. As is the case with other medium-sized owls in Europe, there is some evidence that local snow cover, arid habitats and/or urbanization will increase the importance of avian prey. There was a fairly strong indication of local urban habitat causing the tawny owl to take a large quantity of bird prey in Grunewald. Here, among 13,359 prey items, bird constituted 35.9% with primary prey of this group being house sparrow (Passer domesticus) and European greenfinch (Chloris chloris) and that avian prey was more reliable and productive in the area than rodent prey due to the cyclic populations of the latter. Elsewhere in Germany, in the Pankow borough of Berlin, the house sparrow was also the most regular prey species, at 19.2% of 1912 prey items. The diet of tawny owls in the Polish city of Toruń was also dominated by birds, with them making up 47.8% by number and 51.8% of the biomass against 39.8% of the number and 36.1% of the biomass by mammals. Here the diet was led by the house sparrow (25.9% by number, 22.6% biomass) and secondarily the Eurasian tree sparrow (Passer montanus). In Warsaw, birds were dominant in the city, at 73% of the food. However, much like Toruń, in the rural or outer suburban vicinity (i.e. the Kampinos Forest) outside the urbanized areas of Warsaw, other prey such as rodents and frogs were favored instead. The urbanization effect was particularly strongly noted in England, where birds constituted only about 4% of the foods in the countryside per two studies, but in Wythenshawe part of Manchester and Holland Park in London, birds made up 89% and 93% of the foods, respectively. The most important avian foods to English tawny owls were the house sparrow (at 27% and 52% in Wythenshawe and Holland Park), the common starling (Sturnus vulgaris) (at 33% in Wythenshawe) and the rock dove (at 22% in Holland Park). Some urban pairs in Italy derived about 50% of their food from rock doves and common swifts (Apus apus) of all ages, grabbing prey of the two species directly off their building ledge nests. In the Sahel of Algeria, where small native rodents are scarce, birds account for about 39% of the diet tawny owls amongst 2472 prey items, in particular the house and Spanish sparrows (Passer hispaniolensis), at 16.6% by number and 17% by biomass. Birds strongly dominated the foods of tawny owls in the Levant area, such as northern Israel, accounting for more than 70% of 229 prey items, especially Passer species. In the northern stretches of the range, when birds are taken, slightly larger avian prey such as thrushes, often averaging about 80 g (2.8 oz), tend to be taken instead of sparrows and the like. In Amsterdamse-Waterleidingduinen area of the Netherlands, birds tended to dominate the biomass especially medium-sized passerines such as common starlings and Eurasian jays (Garrulus glandarius), with these contributing 54% of the biomass in high Apodemus mouse years to 62.7% in low mouse years in March–May. Smaller birds such as birds decrease from 21.1 to 3.1% in the spring while large birds such as pigeons and Eurasian woodcocks (Scolopax rusticola) may increase from 16.2 to 37.7% during high and low years for mice. In a small study from Norway, a large portion of diet consisted of birds in summer (61% of the biomass but only 23.2% by number) while, in winter, voles almost completely dominated the foods.

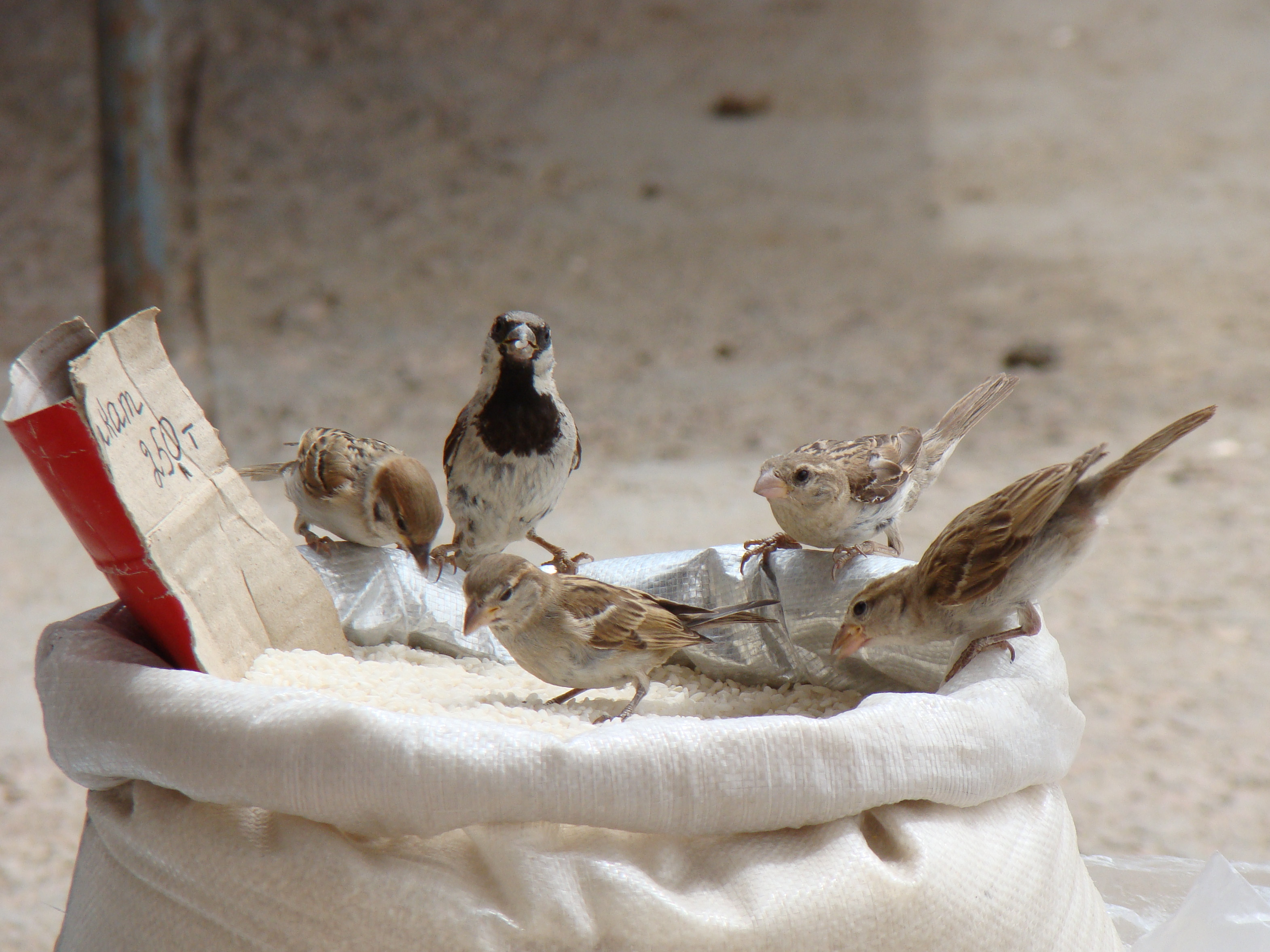
Urban living tawny owls may come to live extensively especially off of sparrows such as house and Eurasian tree sparrows, both pictured.

A huge diversity of birds may be taken by tawny owls, although most are not numerically significant. Slightly over half of the avian prey spectrum for tawny owls are various passerines down to the size of Europe's smallest bird, the 5.2 g (0.18 oz) goldcrest (Regulus regulus). At the other end of the size scale for passerine prey are corvids, including jays, magpies and assorted crows. In some cases, tawny owls have apparently preyed on adult crows of around their own size or slightly larger, such as an estimated 572 g (1.261 lb) carrion crow (Corvus corone). Frequently, the largest prey item found in dietary studies for tawny owls are relatively outsized birds, such as the aforementioned crow, or an estimated 220 g (7.8 oz) western jackdaw (Corvus monedula) in central Italy and a common kestrel (Falco tinniculus) of the same estimated weight in Suffolk. Although many species of dove are also taken, rock doves and common wood pigeon, the latter taken frequently as adults and estimated to average at 480 g (1.06 lb) when taken in England by two different studies, can be very hearty prey. Other large avian prey reported taken as adults by tawny owls (many of which approach or exceed the owls themselves in body mass) includes green-winged teal (Anas crecca), red grouse (Lagopus lagopus scotica), hazel grouse (Tetrastes bonasia), grey partridge (Perdix perdix), chukar (Alectoris chukar) common moorhen (Gallinula chloropus), Eurasian coot (Fulica atra), black-headed gull, black-legged kittiwake (Rissa tridactyla) and black woodpecker (Dryocopus martius). Larger gamebirds have been taken such as black grouse (Tetrao tetrix) and common pheasant (Phasianus colchicus) as well as are some large birds of prey are sometimes found in the foods of tawny owls but it is not clear that these adults and may refer only to juvenile individuals. Reportage of tawny owls predation on much larger western capercaillie (Tetrao urogallus) is quite likely to refer to juvenile capercaillie. In at least one case, a tawny owl preyed upon an adult mallard (Anas platyrhynchos), which, at a mean weight of around 1,060 g (2.34 lb), is about twice a tawny owl's size and possibly the largest prey known to be tackled by the species.

== Reptiles, amphibians and fish ==
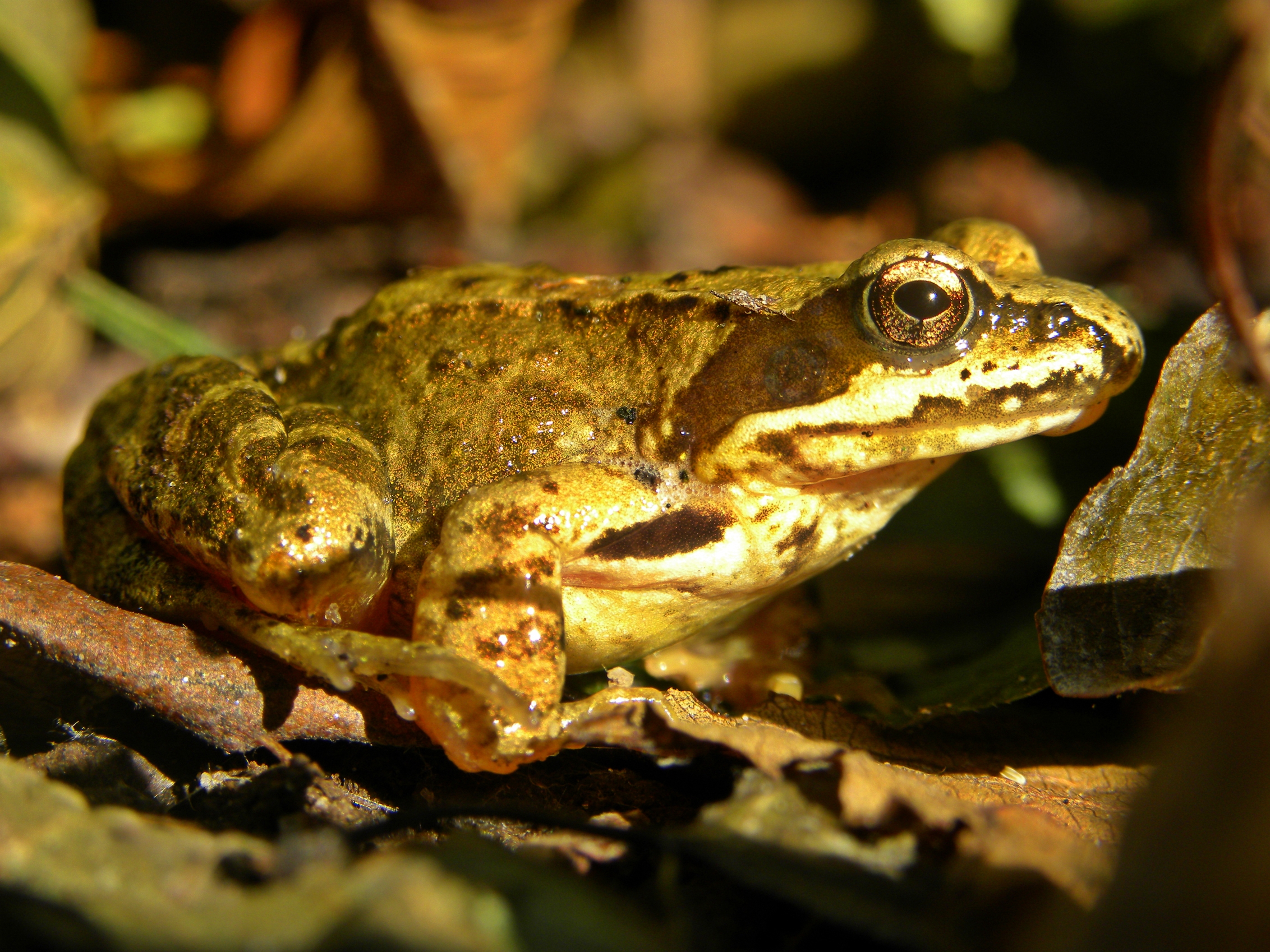
Frogs such as common frogs are a common component of the tawny owl's diet.

Little evidence has been found of tawny owl predation on reptiles. Despite their scarcity about a dozen species are known to be hunted by this predator, including a couple species of snake and several lizard species. They are more or less taken incidentally, constituting always less than 2% of the foods in known European studies. An exceptional case was in Sahel, Algeria, where the Moorish gecko (Tarentola mauritanica) was the leading prey species at 16.75% of 2472 prey items. Amphibians are generally much more prominent in the tawny owl's diet, almost exclusively frogs. Nearly 20 species of amphibian are known to be taken, which includes two species of newt outside of the more typical frogs and toads. Key to predation on frogs is the composition of the habitat, with frogs and toads being apparently much more accessible in remote and conserved areas rather than developed lands. In different areas of Poland, the Rana genus of frogs led the prey composition such as in Białowieża Forest, where they made up 21.1% of the foods, in Wigry National Park where they constituted 17.4% of the diet and in the northeasterly section of the country where they made up 23.4% of 2046 vertebrate prey items. Elsewhere frogs and amphibians are regular but secondary foods. Of 3194 prey items in Finland, amphibians (probably all frogs) were secondary to rodents, and could account for from 16.6% in good vole years to 19.5%, the leading prey type by number, in bad vole years, with an average 17.5%. from all years. In Lithuania, frogs constituted 14.5% of 1125 prey items, with the common frog (Rana temporaria) in particular accounting for 11.2%. In Sahel, Algeria, the Mediterranean painted frog (Discoglossus pictus) was a fairly important prey resource, at 9.22% by number and 10.5% by biomass. The average size of frogs taken can be fairly variable, from an estimated 7 to 39.8 g (0.25 to 1.40 oz), as claimed for central Italy and England, respectively. There are now several instances known of tawny owls preying on fish, though they are not known to be a significant food source anywhere in the distribution. About eight species of wild fish are known to have been captured, including probably young or infirm specimens of large fish such as northern pike (Esox lucius) and brown trout (Salmo trutta), with at least some instances of tawny owls also catching ornamental goldfish (Carassius auratus) as well.

== Invertebrates ==
The tawny owl feeds more extensively on invertebrates than many of the more northerly European studies would indicate. Virtually, any variety of edible invertebrate would be eaten by these owls, though generally insects are taken due to the high occurrence of encounters. Nearly 70 invertebrate prey species have been noted. In the more southerly parts of Europe, much stronger numbers of invertebrates tend to be detected. In central Italy, invertebrates constituted 53.3% of 654 prey items, in particular scarab beetles (15.8%), land snails (12.1%), ground beetles (5.3%), Orthoptera (5.14%) and longhorn beetles (5%). In the vicinity of Umbria in Italy, 47.8% of 874 prey items were invertebrates, particularly keelback slugs and roundback slugs, which together made up 28.6% of the prey items followed among invertebrates by Melolonthinae subfamily of scarab beetles at about 7% of the prey. In Muránska planina National Park in Slovakia, keelback slugs were the most identified prey type among 13,912 prey items, accounting for 26.1%. Keelback slugs were also the main prey type in Bulgaria (accounting for 24.6% of 529 prey items), and detected in strong numbers in Romania, the Caucasus and Crimea (wherein they made up 21.8% of 514 prey items, but trailed by number the yellow-necked mouse). A strong dominance of insect prey was detected in food studies from Spain, with 64.3% of 1002 prey items from across the nation being invertebrates. In the Spanish region, the wood mouse was the identified single prey species (at 20% by number and 21% by biomass) but was closely followed by bush crickets (at 19.76% and 1.5% biomass), Rhizotrogus aestivus (10.76% by number, 0.5% biomass), European field cricket (Gryllus campestris) (8.85% by number, 1% biomass), minotaur beetle (Typhaeus typhoeus) (7.92% #, 1% biomass) and common dor beetle (Anoplotrupes stercorosus) (4.35% by number, 1% biomass). More locally within the Province of León, beetles collectively constituted 35.1% of the diet and Orthoptera constituted 14.4%. In Sahel, Algeria, invertebrates in total slightly outnumbered mammals, but lagged slightly behind birds in number. In general, insects in central and northern Europe are a regular but secondary food source, taken in similar volume to birds but far less significant as contributors to biomass. Tawny owls are said to take beetles in central Europe more frequently in April–May before ground cover becomes too extensive. An exceptional case of invertebrates being primary as a food source in a northerly country was recorded in the Peak District of England, wherein earthworms were the primary food type, at 40.4% of 926 prey items and 15.6% of the biomass. Strong numbers were detected here too of Geotrupes beetles, contributing 14% of the prey numbers.

== Interspecies predatory relationships ==
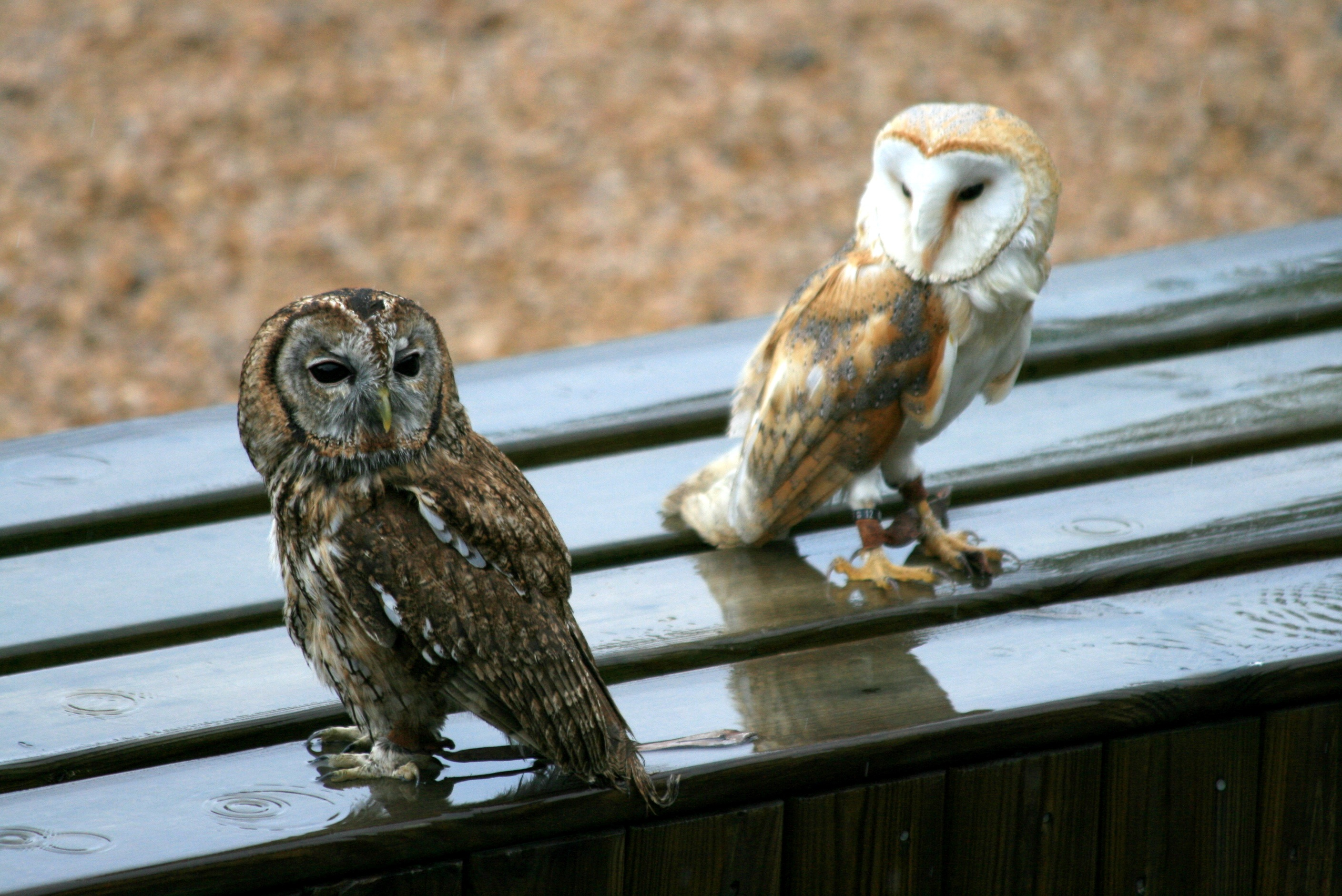
A captive tawny owl with a large barn owl, usually the tawny owl is behaviourly dominant and slightly larger than the barn owl.

In every part of its range, tawny owls co-exist with other birds of prey, with other owls presenting the strongest possibility for competition given their overlapping food selection and shared nocturnality. As perhaps the most numerous and one of the most widely distributed in the continent of the 13 owl species regularly occurring in Europe, ecological interactions of some kind have been recorded with most other species. Given their medium-sized frame and general adaptability, of special interest is how they co-exist with other medium-sized owls such as long-eared owls and barn owls. Many studies have contrasted particularly the food habits of long-eared owls living in proximity to tawny owls. Generally speaking, the long-eared owls in Europe are much more strongly disposed to being a specialist species than the tawny owl, relying almost entirely on voles. Although in the broad picture, the long-eared also feeds on other prey such as birds and insects, their food niche breadth is consistently lower than that of the tawny owls. For example, in a very large study of central Europe, the common vole species alone constituted about 76% of 57,500 prey items for long-eared owls. Long-eared owls also differ strongly from tawny owls in selecting much more open hunting grounds, such as old fields, usually hunting on the wing rather than from a perch and in utilizing abandoned (and often rather open) bird nests rather than natural cavities as nesting sites. In terms of peri-urbanisation, the long-eared and tawny owls are more or less equally adaptive to such areas. The food niche breadth is usually greater in Europe for the tawny owl than for the barn owl as well, although the barn owl appears to have a stronger liking of shrews as prey than does the tawny owl (shrews more than twice as often selected). The barn owl, although also by nature a cavity nester, does not generally acclimate to well-wooded areas where the tawny owl is at home. Both the long-eared and barn owls prefer voles where they are available, especially as both often hunt in open areas where they are common, whereas Apodemus mice tend to be slightly preferred by tawny owls. When conflicts ensue, the tawny owl tends to dominate these other medium-sized owls. This is in part due to their size advantage, with the tawny being larger by an average of 32% (of 3 standards of measurements, two from the wing, one by body mass) than the long-eared owl and 24% larger than the barn owl. Tawny owls are known to readily evict barn owls from their own nest sites, normally when taking up residency in towns or cities. It was additionally found that barn owls, being a species better adapted to warmer, more tropical areas, is at higher risk of starvation in cool weather than long-eared and tawny owls, with proportionately many more found dead in winter in France due presumably to inferior lipid fat reserves.

In the British Isles, the tawny owl is the largest and most powerful year-around native owl, ahead slightly of the long-eared and barn owls. Therefore, the tawny owl may be considered an apex predator here (despite still being vulnerable occasionally to diurnal raptors and ground predators). However, since the tawny owl never colonized Ireland, here the long-eared owl is the largest year-around owl (in these island much larger owls are very rare winter visitors, in the case of the snowy owl (Bubo scandiacus) or are probably accidentally introduced by humans, as is likely the Eurasian eagle-owl). However, in much of mainland Europe and elsewhere, tawny owls potentially overlap with larger owls and, depending on habitat composition and prey accessibilities, may be considered more correctly a mesopredator. Mainly in parts of northern and eastern Europe, tawny owls sometimes co-exist with their larger cousins, Ural owls. The Ural owl has generally similar nesting and feeding habits but tends to occur in slightly different habitats. Generally, the Ural is more broadly adaptive to taiga and similarly conifer based forests than are tawny owls and is also somewhat more likely to be active during daylight. In eastern Europe, the Ural species tends to occur more so at higher elevation in montane forest such as the Carpathian Mountains, especially those with extensive old growth of beech trees, while the tawny owls tend to occur at lower elevations and more mixed forest with fewer glades in these areas. A relatively low territory overlap of 13.3% was detected in Slovakia between tawny and Ural owl territories due to their differing habitats. Depending on range, the prey sizes taken by tawny owls tend to be considerably smaller than those selected by the more powerful Ural owl, with the latter's mean prey sizes averaging from 31 to 50% larger. However, the food niche breadth is up to two and a half times greater in the tawny than in the Ural owl. The Ural owl tends to dominate interspecific conflicts with tawny owls. On the contrary, in at least one case a tawny owl was observed to fiercely attack and drive off a Ural owl (although it may not be ruled out that this was a case of mobbing). A third and much larger still Strix species, the great grey owl, differs considerably in almost all respects of its life history from tawny owls. The great grey is adapted to taiga and other conifer based forests, both open and enclosed, and relies almost exclusively on voles for food. Almost cathemeral in activity, the great grey species may nest in a broad variety of situations in the boreal habitat but never utilizes tree cavities as does the tawny. Due to the latter species' specialization, the tawny owl is spared from any known ecological interactions with the great grey owl.

Much more dangerous than larger Strix species to the tawny owl is the Eurasian eagle-owl. A similar wide-ranging generalist, the eagle owl most often nests in and around rock formations, often in fairly mountainous areas, but locally is also adaptive to varying habitats and may too nesting in old birds nests or on the ground, usually between the trunks of large trees. In terms of their dietary habits, the eagle owl appears to be perhaps an even more indiscriminate predator, attacking animals of all taxonomic classes unfortunate enough to encounter them. Given its far larger size and much more powerful features, the eagle owl will attack much larger prey than tawny owls, even relative to their own size. Tawny owls are likely to avoid encounters with eagle-owls and are fortunate in many areas that the eagle-owl, which requires a larger home range and tends to more exclusively prefer remote areas than tawnys, can be scarce to absent in some parts of Europe. In some areas of Spain and Italy, tawny owls have adapted to live in the vicinity of wooded montane areas and even to nesting within rock formations. Both countries have healthy recovered populations of eagle-owls, so tawny owls appear to locally restrict their vocal activity and tend to occur on the fringes or outside active eagle-owl ranges. Unlike their larger, more powerful cousin, the Ural owl, the tawny owl is not infrequently victim to predation by larger raptors. There are at least 300 recorded instances of predation on tawny owls in Europe by Eurasian eagle-owls. They tend to be taken somewhat less than other medium-sized owls, especially long-eared owls, by eagle owls by virtue of using woodlands (which differ somewhat from the habitats usually used by eagle-owls) and nesting in tree hollows. The other greatest predatory threat is certain to be the Eurasian goshawk (Accipiter gentilis). There are at least a hundred cases of goshawks taking the owls and, unlike the eagle-owl, the habitats of the goshawks do fairly closely mirror those of tawny owls with the owls only spared by its different primary times of activity.

Other predators long known to have taken tawny owls have included their larger cousins, the Ural owls as well as common buzzards (Buteo buteo), red kites (Milvus milvus) and peregrine falcons (Falco peregrinus). In addition, more reported raptorial predators have included the Bonelli's eagle (Aquila fasciata), golden eagle (Aquila chrysaetos), eastern imperial eagle (Aquila heliaca) and black kite (Milvus migrans) Outside of traditionally raptorial groups, birds such as corvids may destroy and/or compromise tawny owl nests, either for food, anti-predator behaviour and/or competition. Western jackdaws, in particular, appear to be persistent competitors for nest sites and sometimes are aggressive enough as to displace tawny owls from a disputed site. In extreme cases of competition with jackdaws, the owls may bring themselves to starvation trying to incubate their nests in the hole when a murder of jackdaws continuously visit, harass and place a new nest on top of the owl's eggs repeatedly. In other cases, the owls nestlings have been suffocated by the jackdaws building a nest directly on top of the still living owl broods. Mammalian predators are a fairly frequent threat to tawny owls as well, though tend to attack almost exclusively during the breeding season. European pine martens are known to be a considerable threat of all aged tawny owls at nests from nestlings to brooding females, as are probably stone martens (Martes foina). In a food study in France, 9% of the diet of pine martens was found to consist of tawny owls, with the data indicating that owls using nest boxes are more vulnerable to martens. Especially once reaching or around the age of fledging, red foxes (Vulpes vulpes) are known to take several young tawny owls (and perhaps an unwary adult), at times taking up to 39% of young owls in a population, as are probably cats (Felis silvestris) in some areas. However, in chance encounters during the day, tawny owls have been known to attack and successfully chase off pine martens and have been seen to do the same to red foxes, cats and dogs.

The tawny owl is a considerable predator itself of smaller owls. Data indicates that it is second deadliest owl to the smaller species of owl in Europe, behind only the eagle owl. Among their known owl prey species are Eurasian scops owls (Otus scops), Eurasian pygmy owls, little owls (Athene noctua), long-eared owls and boreal owls (Aegolius funereus). Additionally, they may hunt smaller diurnal birds of prey such as Eurasian sparrowhawks (Accipiter nisus), common kestrels (Falco tinnunculus), Eurasian hobbies (Falco subbuteo) and merlins (Falco columbarius). Reports of tawny owls killing common buzzards and northern goshawks are of nebulous detail and may refer in fact to nighttime nest robberies rather than overpowering adults of these larger, dangerous and often seemingly avoided raptors. Evidence from Slovenia has indicated that the tawny owl is more feared by small owls such as the boreal owl than even the larger, more powerful Ural owl, as they clustered more strongly as can be explained by habitat in the realm of Ural owl territories but seemed to avoid where possible tawny owl territories. Although there are more known instances of tawny owls hunting little owls, data in central Europe could not distinguish whether little owls were avoiding tawny owls or the wooded habitats they frequent to account for their sometimes spotty ranges. However, when forced to nest in quite close proximity to tawny owls and other medium-sized owl species due to clustered "islands" of habitat remaining in southeastern Poland, the productivity of little owls appeared to lower. Predation by tawny owls can be severe as well on Eurasian pygmy owls, to such an extent that they may have cause the regional extinction of the pygmy around World War II in the Black Forest after the smaller species was already depleted by deforestation. A successful reintroduction of Eurasian pygmies into the forest was followed by a natural range expansion back into the forest by tawnys, which again threatens the population growth of smaller owl.
