= Rhizotrogus parvulus =

Scientific classification
- Kingdom: Animalia
- Phylum: Arthropoda
- Clade: Pancrustacea
- Class: Insecta
- Order: Coleoptera
- Suborder: Polyphaga
- Infraorder: Scarabaeiformia
- Family: Scarabaeidae
- Tribe: Melolonthini
- Genus: Rhizotrogus
- Species: R. parvulus

Binomial name
- Rhizotrogus parvulus Rosenhauer, 1858

Synonyms
- Rhizotrogus carthagenae Fairmaire, 1880; Rhizotrogus hidalgo Perez-Arcas, 1872; Rhizotrogus toletanus Baguena-Corella, 1955

Species of beetle

Rhizotrogus parvulus is a species of beetle in the Melolonthinae subfamily that is endemic to Spain.
