= Rhizotrogus mascarauxi =

Scientific classification
- Kingdom: Animalia
- Phylum: Arthropoda
- Clade: Pancrustacea
- Class: Insecta
- Order: Coleoptera
- Suborder: Polyphaga
- Infraorder: Scarabaeiformia
- Family: Scarabaeidae
- Tribe: Melolonthini
- Genus: Rhizotrogus
- Species: R. mascarauxi

Binomial name
- Rhizotrogus mascarauxi Desbrochers, 1895

Synonyms
- Rhizotrogus fernandesi Baraud, 1966; Rhizotrogus reichii Mulsant & Rey, 1871; Rhizotrogus sulcifrons Baguena Corella, 1955; Rhizotrogus zuzartei Baraud & Branco, 1981

Species of beetle

Rhizotrogus mascarauxi is a species of beetle in the Melolonthinae subfamily that can be found in France and Spain.
