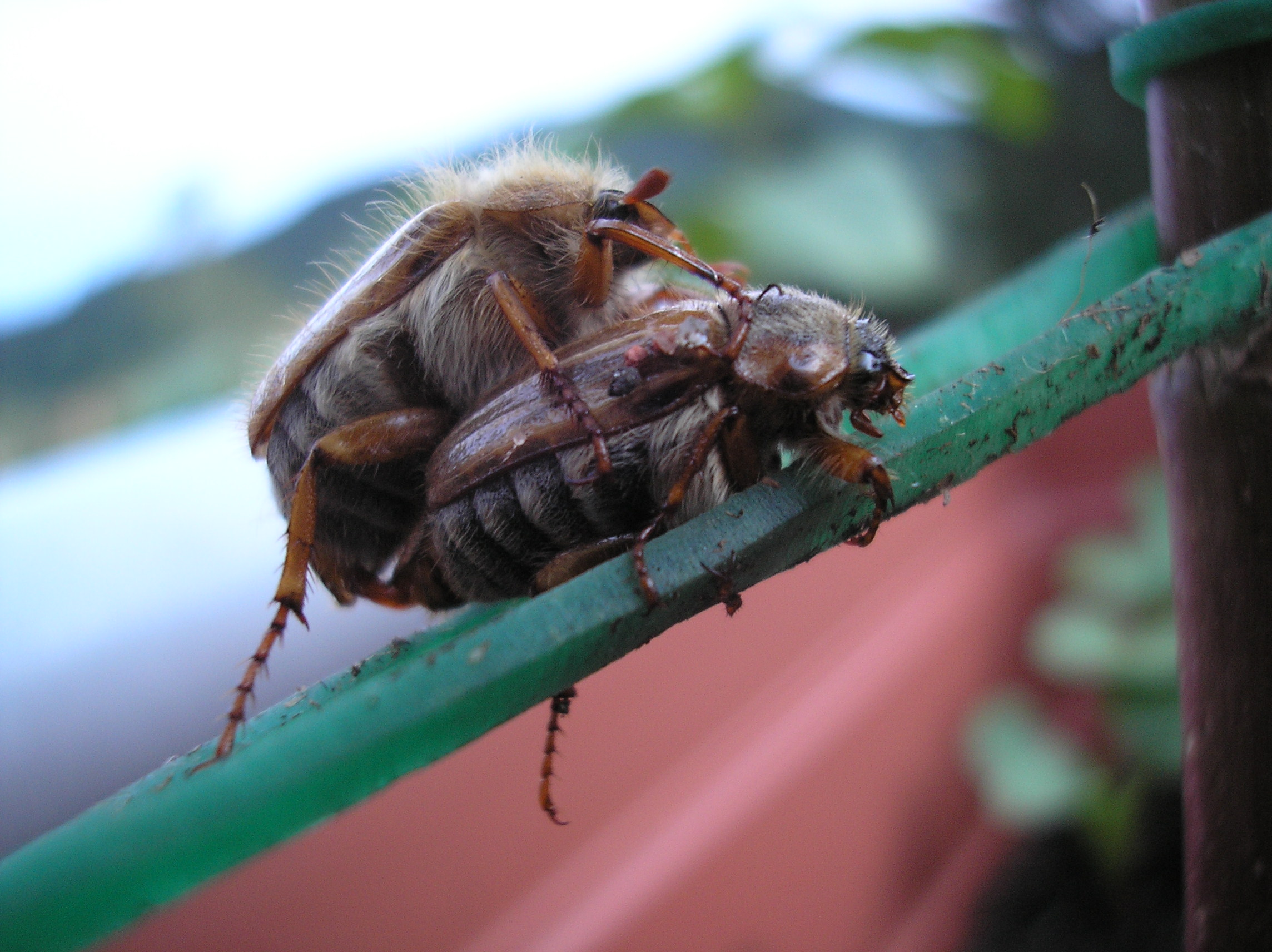

Scientific classification
- Kingdom: Animalia
- Phylum: Arthropoda
- Clade: Pancrustacea
- Class: Insecta
- Order: Coleoptera
- Suborder: Polyphaga
- Infraorder: Scarabaeiformia
- Family: Scarabaeidae
- Tribe: Melolonthini
- Genus: Rhizotrogus
- Species: R. marginipes

Binomial name
- Rhizotrogus marginipes Mulsant, 1842

Synonyms
- Rhizotrogus foveolatus Bach, 1850; Rhizotrogus geniculatus Chevrolat, 1865; Rhizotrogus granulifer Rosenhauer, 1856; Rhizotrogus pallidus Mulsant, 1842; Rhizotrogus piemontanus Brenske, 1891; Rhizotrogus signatus Mulsant, 1842; Rhizotrogus variolatus Fairmaire, 1880

= Rhizotrogus marginipes =

Species of beetle

Rhizotrogus marginipes is a species of beetle in the Melolonthinae subfamily that can be found in France, Germany, Italy, Kosovo, Montenegro, Portugal, Serbia, Spain, Switzerland and Voivodina.
