= Rhizotrogus villiersi =

Scientific classification
- Kingdom: Animalia
- Phylum: Arthropoda
- Clade: Pancrustacea
- Class: Insecta
- Order: Coleoptera
- Suborder: Polyphaga
- Infraorder: Scarabaeiformia
- Family: Scarabaeidae
- Tribe: Melolonthini
- Genus: Rhizotrogus
- Species: R. villiersi

Binomial name
- Rhizotrogus villiersi Baraud, 1970

Species of beetle

Rhizotrogus villiersi is a species of beetle in the Melolonthinae subfamily that is endemic to Portugal.
