= Rhizotrogus chevrolati =

Scientific classification
- Kingdom: Animalia
- Phylum: Arthropoda
- Clade: Pancrustacea
- Class: Insecta
- Order: Coleoptera
- Suborder: Polyphaga
- Infraorder: Scarabaeiformia
- Family: Scarabaeidae
- Tribe: Melolonthini
- Genus: Rhizotrogus
- Species: R. chevrolati

Binomial name
- Rhizotrogus chevrolati Graells, 1858

Synonyms
- Rhizotrogus bicoloripennis Baraud, 1975; Rhizotrogus plagiatus Marseul, 1878

Species of beetle

Rhizotrogus chevrolati is a species of beetle in the Melolonthinae subfamily that is endemic to Spain.
