= Rhizotrogus monticola =

Scientific classification
- Kingdom: Animalia
- Phylum: Arthropoda
- Clade: Pancrustacea
- Class: Insecta
- Order: Coleoptera
- Suborder: Polyphaga
- Infraorder: Scarabaeiformia
- Family: Scarabaeidae
- Tribe: Melolonthini
- Genus: Rhizotrogus
- Species: R. monticola

Binomial name
- Rhizotrogus monticola Blanchard, 1850

Synonyms
- Rhizotrogus cobosi Baguena-Corella, 1956; Rhizotrogus jeannei Baraud, 1970; Rhizotrogus monochromus Baguena-Corella, 1955

Species of beetle

Rhizotrogus monticola is a species of beetle in the Melolonthinae subfamily that is endemic to Spain.
