= Rhizotrogus pallidipennis =

Scientific classification
- Kingdom: Animalia
- Phylum: Arthropoda
- Clade: Pancrustacea
- Class: Insecta
- Order: Coleoptera
- Suborder: Polyphaga
- Infraorder: Scarabaeiformia
- Family: Scarabaeidae
- Tribe: Melolonthini
- Genus: Rhizotrogus
- Species: R. pallidipennis

Binomial name
- Rhizotrogus pallidipennis Blanchard, 1850

Synonyms
- Rhizotrogus anachoreta Rosenhauer, 1856; Rhizotrogus areolus Reitter, 1902; Rhizotrogus gulosus Fairmaire & Coquerel, 1860; Rhizotrogus lepidus Ludovici & Schaufuss, 1869; Amphimallon menorcanum Reitter, 1902; Rhizotrogus occidentalis Escalera, 1914; Rhizotrogus phidias Reitter, 1902; Rhizotrogus signatitarsis Chevrolat, 1866; Rhizotrogus phidias Reitter, 1902; Rhizotrogus vexator Ludovici & Schaufuss, 1869

Species of beetle

Rhizotrogus pallidipennis is a species of beetle in the Melolonthinae subfamily that is endemic to Balearic Islands.
