= Rhizotrogus rosalesi =

Scientific classification
- Kingdom: Animalia
- Phylum: Arthropoda
- Clade: Pancrustacea
- Class: Insecta
- Order: Coleoptera
- Suborder: Polyphaga
- Infraorder: Scarabaeiformia
- Family: Scarabaeidae
- Tribe: Melolonthini
- Genus: Rhizotrogus
- Species: R. rosalesi

Binomial name
- Rhizotrogus rosalesi Fairmaire, 1862

Synonyms
- Rhizotrogus carmonensis Baguena-Corella, 1960; Rhizotrogus epistomalis Baguena-Corella, 1955; Rhizotrogus gougeleti Fairmaire, 1869

Species of beetle

Rhizotrogus rosalesi is a species of beetle in the Melolonthinae subfamily that is endemic to Spain.
