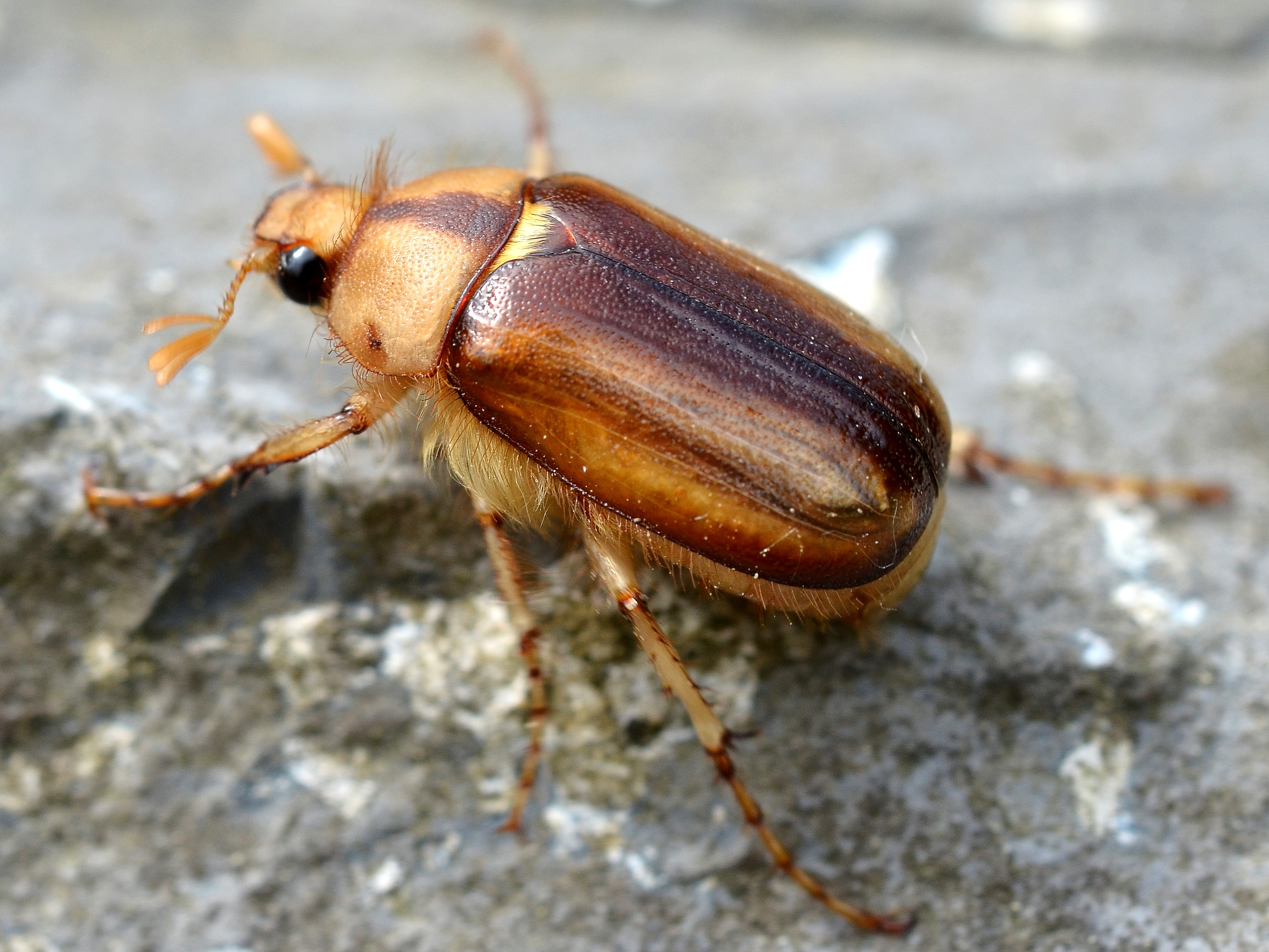
- Rhizotrogus aestivus See text

Scientific classification
- Kingdom: Animalia
- Phylum: Arthropoda
- Clade: Pancrustacea
- Class: Insecta
- Order: Coleoptera
- Suborder: Polyphaga
- Infraorder: Scarabaeiformia
- Family: Scarabaeidae
- Tribe: Melolonthini
- Genus: Rhizotrogus; Lepeletier & Serville, 1825

= Rhizotrogus =

Genus of beetles

Rhizotrogus is a genus of scarab beetles (and June beetles) in the subfamily Melolonthinae.

== List of species ==
- Rhizotrogus aestivus (Olivier, 1789)
- Rhizotrogus almeriensis Baraud, 1970
- Rhizotrogus angelesae Galante, 1981
- Rhizotrogus camerosensis Baguena-Corella, 1955
- Rhizotrogus chevrolati Graells, 1858
- Rhizotrogus coiffaiti Baraud, 1979
- Rhizotrogus creticus Brenske, 1891
- Rhizotrogus flavicans Blanchard, 1850
- Rhizotrogus granatensis Baguena-Corella, 1955
- Rhizotrogus iglesiasi (Baguena-Corella, 1955)
- Rhizotrogus marginipes Mulsant, 1842
- Rhizotrogus mascarauxi Desbrochers, 1895
- Rhizotrogus monticola Blanchard, 1850
- Rhizotrogus nevadensis Reitter, 1902
- Rhizotrogus pallidipennis Blanchard, 1850
- Rhizotrogus parvulus Rosenhauer, 1858
- Rhizotrogus ribbei Reitter, 1908
- Rhizotrogus romanoi Sabatinelli, 1975
- Rhizotrogus rosalesi Fairmaire, 1862
- Rhizotrogus sassariensis Perris, 1870
- Rhizotrogus siculus Baraud, 1970
- Rhizotrogus villiersi Baraud, 1970
