= Rhizotrogus camerosensis =

Scientific classification
- Kingdom: Animalia
- Phylum: Arthropoda
- Clade: Pancrustacea
- Class: Insecta
- Order: Coleoptera
- Suborder: Polyphaga
- Infraorder: Scarabaeiformia
- Family: Scarabaeidae
- Tribe: Melolonthini
- Genus: Rhizotrogus
- Species: R. camerosensis

Binomial name
- Rhizotrogus camerosensis Baguena-Corella, 1955

Synonyms
- Rhizotrogus parcepunctatus Baguena-Corella, 1955; Rhizotrogus pilicauda Baguena-Corella, 1955; Rhizotrogus turolensis Baguena-Corella, 1955

Species of beetle

Rhizotrogus camerosensis is a species of beetle in the Melolonthinae subfamily that is endemic to Spain.
