= Rhizotrogus sassariensis =

Scientific classification
- Kingdom: Animalia
- Phylum: Arthropoda
- Clade: Pancrustacea
- Class: Insecta
- Order: Coleoptera
- Suborder: Polyphaga
- Infraorder: Scarabaeiformia
- Family: Scarabaeidae
- Tribe: Melolonthini
- Genus: Rhizotrogus
- Species: R. sassariensis

Binomial name
- Rhizotrogus sassariensis Perris, 1870

Species of beetle

Rhizotrogus sassariensis is a species of beetle in the Melolonthinae subfamily that can be found in Italy and its islands such as Sardinia and French island of Corsica.
