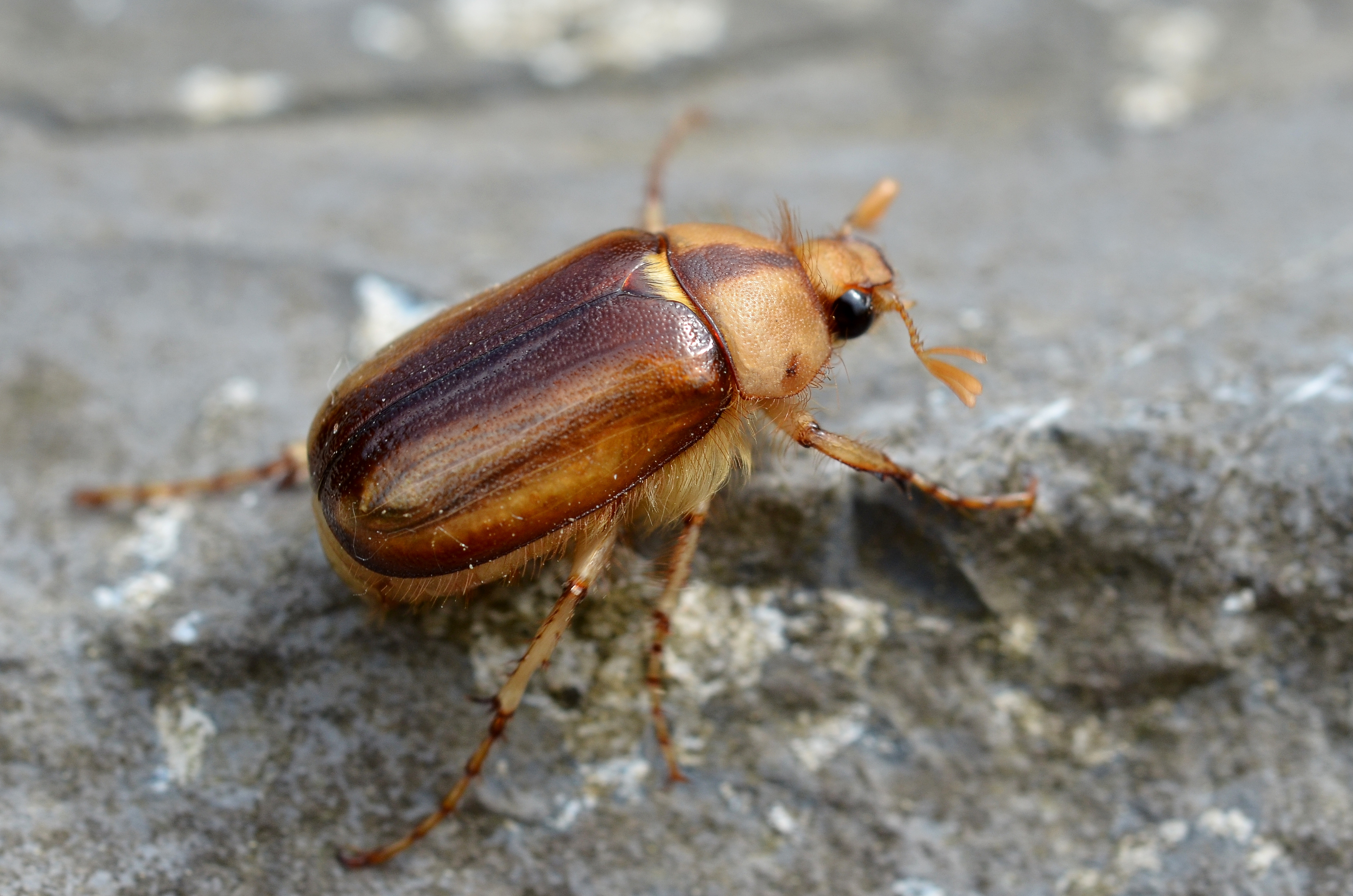

Scientific classification
- Kingdom: Animalia
- Phylum: Arthropoda
- Clade: Pancrustacea
- Class: Insecta
- Order: Coleoptera
- Suborder: Polyphaga
- Infraorder: Scarabaeiformia
- Family: Scarabaeidae
- Tribe: Melolonthini
- Genus: Rhizotrogus
- Species: R. aestivus

Binomial name
- Rhizotrogus aestivus (Olivier, 1789)

Synonyms
- Melolontha bimaculata Herbst, 1790; Melolontha gracilis Frölich, 1792; Melolontha inanis Brahm, 1793; Melolontha maculicollis Zubkoff, 1833; Rhizotrogus faldermanni Reiche, 1862; Rhizotrogus incertus Mulsant, 1842; Rhizotrogus lividigaster Mulsant, 1842; Rhizotrogus nudicollis Dalla Torre, 1879; Rhizotrogus subvittatus Mulsant, 1842

= Rhizotrogus aestivus =

Species of beetle

Rhizotrogus aestivus is a species of brown beetle in the Melolonthinae subfamily that can be found in Austria, France, and Spain. It also occurs in the Czech Republic, Slovakia, and Russia.
