= Atysilla straminea =

Scientific classification
- Kingdom: Animalia
- Phylum: Arthropoda
- Clade: Pancrustacea
- Class: Insecta
- Order: Coleoptera
- Suborder: Polyphaga
- Infraorder: Scarabaeiformia
- Family: Scarabaeidae
- Genus: Atysilla
- Species: A. straminea

Binomial name
- Atysilla straminea (Péringuey, 1904)

Synonyms
- Atys straminea Péringuey, 1904

Species of beetle

Atysilla straminea is a species of beetle of the family Scarabaeidae. It is found in Namibia.

== Description ==
Adults reach a length of about 10 mm (0.39 in). They are similar to Atysilla hybrida in shape and size, but the clypeus is much more blunt and plainly sinuate in the middle in front. Furthermore, the punctures on the pronotum are almost confluent on the sides and in the anterior part, and the smooth interspaces of the discoidal part form transverse, somewhat irregular folds not unlike the supra-basal ones. The punctures along the base are very broad.
