= Atysilla humilis =

Scientific classification
- Kingdom: Animalia
- Phylum: Arthropoda
- Clade: Pancrustacea
- Class: Insecta
- Order: Coleoptera
- Suborder: Polyphaga
- Infraorder: Scarabaeiformia
- Family: Scarabaeidae
- Genus: Atysilla
- Species: A. humilis

Binomial name
- Atysilla humilis (Péringuey, 1904)

Synonyms
- Atys humilis Péringuey, 1904

Species of beetle

Atysilla humilis is a species of beetle of the family Scarabaeidae. It is found in South Africa (Eastern Cape).

== Description ==
Adults reach a length of about 12–13 mm (0.47–0.51 in). They are brick-red and shining, with the antennae flavescent. The pronotum is covered with round, equi-distant punctures, and has in the middle a faintly raised, longitudinal, narrow, smooth band. The scutellum has one row of punctures often partly obliterated and the elytra are somewhat deeply punctured. The pygidium is covered )with the exception of the apical part) with round punctures separated from each other by a space equal to their own diameter.

== Taxonomy ==
Some authors consider Atysilla humilis to be a synonym of Atysilla corrosa.
