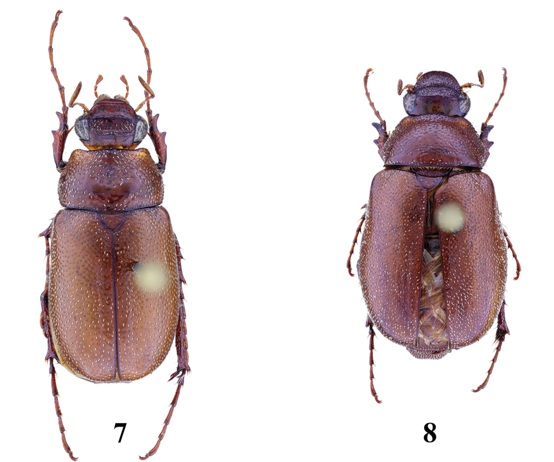
- 1: Male - 2: Female

Scientific classification
- Kingdom: Animalia
- Phylum: Arthropoda
- Clade: Pancrustacea
- Class: Insecta
- Order: Coleoptera
- Suborder: Polyphaga
- Infraorder: Scarabaeiformia
- Family: Scarabaeidae
- Tribe: Melolonthini
- Genus: Entyposis
- Species: E. mendax

Binomial name
- Entyposis mendax Péringuey, 1904

Synonyms
- Entyposis montana Moser, 1913; Schizonycha nyukana Kolbe, 1910

= Entyposis mendax =

Species of beetle

Entyposis mendax is a species of beetle of the family Scarabaeidae. It is found in Kenya, Tanzania and Zimbabwe.

== Description ==
Adults reach a length of about 12 mm (0.47 in). They have the same shape and colour as Schizonycha infans, but are very slightly longer and may be distinguished by a conspicuous squamose white hair in every puncture on the upper side. On the abdomen and pectus these squamose white hairs are also found, but they are-slightly smaller on the lower than on the upper side. The pronotum has the outer margin very faintly serrate, and has a broad shallow discoidal impression reaching from the median part to the anterior margin which bears a small tubercle in the centre, and it is covered on the sides with somewhat broad but closely set punctures having scabrose intervals, but the punctures in the median impression are not very closely set, and the intervals are smooth. The scutellum is not very distinctly punctured, while the elytra are deeply punctured, the punctures are equi-distant, and along the basal part, the intervals are slightly raised. The pygidium is covered with equi-distant shallow punctures separated by a narrow interval.
