= Atysilla inscita =

Scientific classification
- Kingdom: Animalia
- Phylum: Arthropoda
- Clade: Pancrustacea
- Class: Insecta
- Order: Coleoptera
- Suborder: Polyphaga
- Infraorder: Scarabaeiformia
- Family: Scarabaeidae
- Genus: Atysilla
- Species: A. inscita

Binomial name
- Atysilla inscita (Péringuey, 1904)

Synonyms
- Atys inscita Péringuey, 1904

Species of beetle

Atysilla inscita is a species of beetle of the family Scarabaeidae. It is found in South Africa (Mpumalanga) and Zimbabwe.

== Description ==
Adults reach a length of about 10.5 mm (0.41 in). They are very similar to Atysilla hybrida, but the shape of the clypeal and frontal keels is different, the antennal club of the male is longer than the pedicel, the pronotum has a broad lateral impression on each side of the anterior part and the punctures are smaller and more closely set, and also slightly more cicatricose on the dorsal part. Also, the second abdominal segment is wider than the third, and the segments are more pubescent in the male than in the female.
