= Atysilla ampullata =

Scientific classification
- Kingdom: Animalia
- Phylum: Arthropoda
- Clade: Pancrustacea
- Class: Insecta
- Order: Coleoptera
- Suborder: Polyphaga
- Infraorder: Scarabaeiformia
- Family: Scarabaeidae
- Genus: Atysilla
- Species: A. ampullata

Binomial name
- Atysilla ampullata (Burgeon, 1946)

Synonyms
- Schizonycha (Atys) ampullata Burgeon, 1946

Species of beetle

Atysilla ampullata is a species of beetle of the family Scarabaeidae. It is found in the Democratic Republic of the Congo.
