= Atysilla simplex =

Scientific classification
- Kingdom: Animalia
- Phylum: Arthropoda
- Clade: Pancrustacea
- Class: Insecta
- Order: Coleoptera
- Suborder: Polyphaga
- Infraorder: Scarabaeiformia
- Family: Scarabaeidae
- Genus: Atysilla
- Species: A. simplex

Binomial name
- Atysilla simplex (Péringuey, 1904)

Synonyms
- Atys simplex Péringuey, 1904

Species of beetle

Atysilla simplex is a species of beetle of the family Scarabaeidae. It is found in Zimbabwe.

== Description ==
Adults reach a length of about 11 mm (0.43 in). They are chestnut-red and moderately shining with the elytra chestnut-brown. Each puncture on the upper side bears a somewhat plainly squamose hair, and underneath a conspicuous white scale. The club of the antennae is somewhat infuscate in females.
