= Atysilla inverta =

Scientific classification
- Kingdom: Animalia
- Phylum: Arthropoda
- Clade: Pancrustacea
- Class: Insecta
- Order: Coleoptera
- Suborder: Polyphaga
- Infraorder: Scarabaeiformia
- Family: Scarabaeidae
- Genus: Atysilla
- Species: A. inverta

Binomial name
- Atysilla inverta (Péringuey, 1904)

Synonyms
- Atys inverta Péringuey, 1904; Schizonycha inverta

Species of beetle

Atysilla inverta is a species of beetle of the family Scarabaeidae. It is found in Mozambique.

== Description ==
Adults reach a length of about 11.5 mm (0.45 in). They are light brick-red, with the elytra paler. The hairs in the punctures are extremely minute. The pronotum is covered with cicatricose punctures separated by narrow, somewhat sharp walls on the sides, and a little wider and not quite so closely set in the median and basal discoidal parts, there is no smooth transverse fold above the base. The scutellum has two series of punctures and the elytra are deeply and closely punctured with the punctures equal in size and separated from each other by a space narrower than their own diameter. The pygidium is covered with deep, round, nearly contiguous punctures divided by a narrow wall.
