= Entyposis capito =

Scientific classification
- Kingdom: Animalia
- Phylum: Arthropoda
- Clade: Pancrustacea
- Class: Insecta
- Order: Coleoptera
- Suborder: Polyphaga
- Infraorder: Scarabaeiformia
- Family: Scarabaeidae
- Tribe: Melolonthini
- Genus: Entyposis
- Species: E. capito

Binomial name
- Entyposis capito (Gerstaecker, 1873)

Synonyms
- Schizonycha capito Gerstaecker, 1873; Proseconius capito; Schizonycha cavicollis Fairmaire, 1887; Entyposis cavicollis

Species of beetle

Entyposis capito is a species of beetle of the family Scarabaeidae. It is found in Tanzania.

== Description ==
Adults reach a length of about 12–15 mm (0.47–0.59 in). They have a reddish-brown forebody, while the elytra are orange-yellow.
