= Entyposis madogolelei =

Scientific classification
- Kingdom: Animalia
- Phylum: Arthropoda
- Clade: Pancrustacea
- Class: Insecta
- Order: Coleoptera
- Suborder: Polyphaga
- Infraorder: Scarabaeiformia
- Family: Scarabaeidae
- Tribe: Melolonthini
- Genus: Entyposis
- Species: E. madogolelei

Binomial name
- Entyposis madogolelei Lacroix & Montreuil, 2012

Species of beetle

Entyposis madogolelei is a species of beetle of the family Scarabaeidae. It is found in Mozambique.

== Description ==
Adults reach a length of about 14 mm (0.55 in). They have a chestnut brown forebody, while the elytra are orange-brown.
