= Atysilla =

Scientific classification
- Kingdom: Animalia
- Phylum: Arthropoda
- Clade: Pancrustacea
- Class: Insecta
- Order: Coleoptera
- Suborder: Polyphaga
- Infraorder: Scarabaeiformia
- Family: Scarabaeidae
- Subfamily: Melolonthinae
- Tribe: Schizonychini
- Genus: Atysilla; Strand, 1942

Synonyms
- Genyoschiza Moser, 1917; Atys Reiche, 1850

Genus of leaf beetles

Atysilla is a genus of beetles belonging to the family Scarabaeidae.

== Species ==
- Atysilla ampullata (Burgeon, 1946)
- Atysilla bredoi (Burgeon, 1946)
- Atysilla corrosa (Burmeister, 1855)
- Atysilla dartevellei (Burgeon, 1946)
- Atysilla diluta (Quedenfeldt, 1884)
- Atysilla fallax (Péringuey, 1904)
- Atysilla glabra (Kolbe, 1894)
- Atysilla humilis (Péringuey, 1904)
- Atysilla hybrida (Péringuey, 1904)
- Atysilla infans (Péringuey, 1904)
- Atysilla inscita (Péringuey, 1904)
- Atysilla inverta (Péringuey, 1904)
- Atysilla lefevrei (Burgeon, 1946)
- Atysilla samenensis (Reiche, 1850)
- Atysilla simplex (Péringuey, 1904)
- Atysilla soror (Burgeon, 1946)
- Atysilla straminea (Péringuey, 1904)
- Atysilla tarsalis (Moser, 1917)
- Atysilla verhulsti (Burgeon, 1946)
- Atysilla vrydaghi (Burgeon, 1946)
- Atysilla wittei (Burgeon, 1946)
