= Entyposis squamulata =

Scientific classification
- Kingdom: Animalia
- Phylum: Arthropoda
- Clade: Pancrustacea
- Class: Insecta
- Order: Coleoptera
- Suborder: Polyphaga
- Infraorder: Scarabaeiformia
- Family: Scarabaeidae
- Tribe: Melolonthini
- Genus: Entyposis
- Species: E. squamulata

Binomial name
- Entyposis squamulata Lacroix & Montreuil, 2012

Species of beetle

Entyposis squamulata is a species of beetle of the family Scarabaeidae. It is found in Kenya and Tanzania.

== Description ==
Adults reach a length of about 16–17 mm (0.63–0.67 in). They have a chestnut brown forebody, while the elytra are fairly dark brown.
