= Atysilla verhulsti =

Scientific classification
- Kingdom: Animalia
- Phylum: Arthropoda
- Clade: Pancrustacea
- Class: Insecta
- Order: Coleoptera
- Suborder: Polyphaga
- Infraorder: Scarabaeiformia
- Family: Scarabaeidae
- Genus: Atysilla
- Species: A. verhulsti

Binomial name
- Atysilla verhulsti (Burgeon, 1946)

Synonyms
- Schizonycha (Atys) verhulsti Burgeon, 1946

Species of beetle

Atysilla verhulsti is a species of beetle of the family Scarabaeidae. It is found in Rwanda and the Democratic Republic of the Congo.
