= Entyposis excavata =

Scientific classification
- Kingdom: Animalia
- Phylum: Arthropoda
- Clade: Pancrustacea
- Class: Insecta
- Order: Coleoptera
- Suborder: Polyphaga
- Infraorder: Scarabaeiformia
- Family: Scarabaeidae
- Tribe: Melolonthini
- Genus: Entyposis
- Species: E. excavata

Binomial name
- Entyposis excavata Lacroix & Montreuil, 2012

Species of beetle

Entyposis excavata is a species of beetle of the family Scarabaeidae. It is found in Tanzania.

== Description ==
Adults reach a length of about 16 mm (0.63 in). They have a chestnut brown forebody and elytra.

== Etymology ==
The species is named after the excavated shape of the pronotum.
