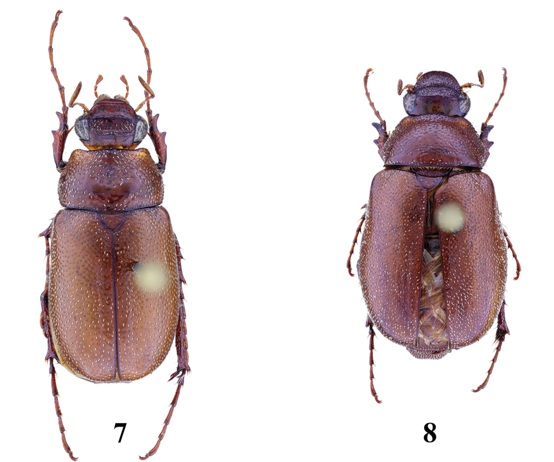
- Entyposis mendax', 1: Male - 2: Female

Scientific classification
- Kingdom: Animalia
- Phylum: Arthropoda
- Clade: Pancrustacea
- Class: Insecta
- Order: Coleoptera
- Suborder: Polyphaga
- Infraorder: Scarabaeiformia
- Family: Scarabaeidae
- Subfamily: Melolonthinae
- Tribe: Melolonthini
- Genus: Entyposis; Kolbe, 1895

Synonyms
- Proseconius Kolbe, 1895

= Entyposis =

Genus of leaf beetles

Entyposis is a genus of beetles belonging to the family Scarabaeidae.

== Species ==
- Entyposis bidentata Lacroix & Montreuil, 2012
- Entyposis capito (Gerstaecker, 1873)
- Entyposis cordipenis Sehnal, 2017
- Entyposis excavata Lacroix & Montreuil, 2012
- Entyposis frici Bezděk & Sehnal, 2023
- Entyposis impressa Kolbe, 1894
- Entyposis madogolelei Lacroix & Montreuil, 2012
- Entyposis martinezi Lacroix & Montreuil, 2012
- Entyposis mendax Péringuey, 1904
- Entyposis rasplusi Lacroix & Montreuil, 2012
- Entyposis squamulata Lacroix & Montreuil, 2012
