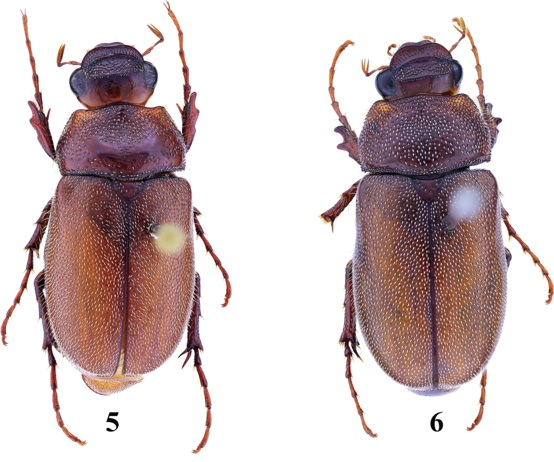
- 1: Male - 2: Female

Scientific classification
- Kingdom: Animalia
- Phylum: Arthropoda
- Clade: Pancrustacea
- Class: Insecta
- Order: Coleoptera
- Suborder: Polyphaga
- Infraorder: Scarabaeiformia
- Family: Scarabaeidae
- Tribe: Melolonthini
- Genus: Entyposis
- Species: E. impressa

Binomial name
- Entyposis impressa Kolbe, 1894

= Entyposis impressa =

Species of beetle

Entyposis impressa is a species of beetle of the family Scarabaeidae. It is found in Kenya and Tanzania.

== Description ==
Adults reach a length of about 14–16 mm (0.55–0.63 in). The upper parts are brownish-orange, while the forebody is a little more reddish.
