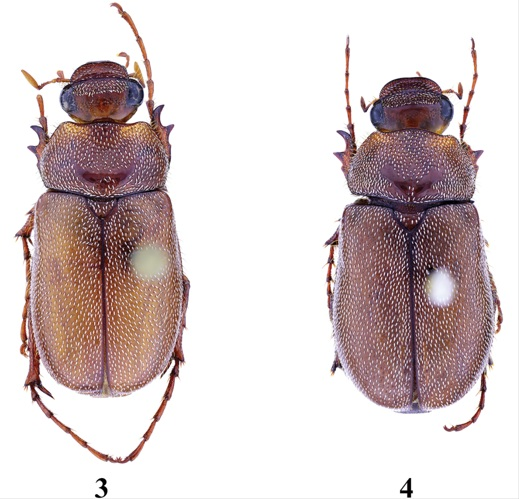
- 1: Male - 2: Female

Scientific classification
- Kingdom: Animalia
- Phylum: Arthropoda
- Clade: Pancrustacea
- Class: Insecta
- Order: Coleoptera
- Suborder: Polyphaga
- Infraorder: Scarabaeiformia
- Family: Scarabaeidae
- Tribe: Melolonthini
- Genus: Entyposis
- Species: E. cordipenis

Binomial name
- Entyposis cordipenis Sehnal, 2017

= Entyposis cordipenis =

Species of beetle

Entyposis cordipenis is a species of beetle of the family Scarabaeidae. It is found in Ethiopia.

== Description ==
Adults reach a length of about 11.5–13.8 mm (0.45–0.54 in). They have an elongate, strongly convex body. The dorsal and ventral surfaces are dull. The head is dark brown, the pronotum pale brown with a yellow apical corner and the elytra are pale brown with darker suture. Most of the dorsal surface is covered only with white, scale-like setae, while the setae on the ventral surface are partly white and partly reddish-yellow.

== Etymology ==
The species name is derived from medial rotation of the paramere apices, which together form a heart shape.
