= Entyposis bidentata =

Scientific classification
- Kingdom: Animalia
- Phylum: Arthropoda
- Clade: Pancrustacea
- Class: Insecta
- Order: Coleoptera
- Suborder: Polyphaga
- Infraorder: Scarabaeiformia
- Family: Scarabaeidae
- Tribe: Melolonthini
- Genus: Entyposis
- Species: E. bidentata

Binomial name
- Entyposis bidentata Lacroix & Montreuil, 2012

Species of beetle

Entyposis bidentata is a species of beetle of the family Scarabaeidae. It is found in Mozambique.

== Description ==
Adults reach a length of about 13 mm (0.51 in). They have a chestnut brown forebody, while the elytra are straw yellow.

== Etymology ==
The species is named after the shape of the male protibia, which has two teeth.
