= Atysilla tarsalis =

Scientific classification
- Kingdom: Animalia
- Phylum: Arthropoda
- Clade: Pancrustacea
- Class: Insecta
- Order: Coleoptera
- Suborder: Polyphaga
- Infraorder: Scarabaeiformia
- Family: Scarabaeidae
- Genus: Atysilla
- Species: A. tarsalis

Binomial name
- Atysilla tarsalis (Moser, 1917)

Synonyms
- Genyoschiza tarsalis Moser, 1917

Species of beetle

Atysilla tarsalis is a species of beetle of the family Scarabaeidae. It is found in Kenya.

== Description ==
Adults reach a length of about 9 mm (0.35 in). They have an elongate, parallel-sided, yellowish-brown body, with the head and pronotum somewhat darker. The head is sparsely punctate. The anterior margin of the pronotum is weakly indented in the middle, and on both sides behind the anterior margin there is a slight impression. The surface is sparsely punctate, the punctures bear tiny setae. The scutellum shows only a few punctures on the sides. The elytra are weakly wrinkled and moderately densely punctured and the punctures show traces of tiny setae. The pygidium is quite extensively covered with punctures bearing tiny bristles, and with yellow hairs in front of the posterior margin.
