= Entyposis martinezi =

Scientific classification
- Kingdom: Animalia
- Phylum: Arthropoda
- Clade: Pancrustacea
- Class: Insecta
- Order: Coleoptera
- Suborder: Polyphaga
- Infraorder: Scarabaeiformia
- Family: Scarabaeidae
- Tribe: Melolonthini
- Genus: Entyposis
- Species: E. martinezi

Binomial name
- Entyposis martinezi Lacroix & Montreuil, 2012

Species of beetle

Entyposis martinezi is a species of beetle of the family Scarabaeidae. It is found in Mozambique.

== Description ==
Adults reach a length of about 15–16 mm (0.59–0.63 in). They have a dark chestnut brown forebody, while the elytra are dark brown.

== Etymology ==
The species is dedicated to Mr. Martinez, one of its collectors.
