= Entyposis rasplusi =

Scientific classification
- Kingdom: Animalia
- Phylum: Arthropoda
- Clade: Pancrustacea
- Class: Insecta
- Order: Coleoptera
- Suborder: Polyphaga
- Infraorder: Scarabaeiformia
- Family: Scarabaeidae
- Tribe: Melolonthini
- Genus: Entyposis
- Species: E. rasplusi

Binomial name
- Entyposis rasplusi Lacroix & Montreuil, 2012

Species of beetle

Entyposis rasplusi is a species of beetle of the family Scarabaeidae. It is found in Mozambique.

== Description ==
Adults reach a length of about 14–16 mm (0.55–0.63 in). They have an orange-brown forebody, while the elytra are straw-yellow.

== Etymology ==
The species is dedicated to J.Y. Rasplus, one of its collectors.
