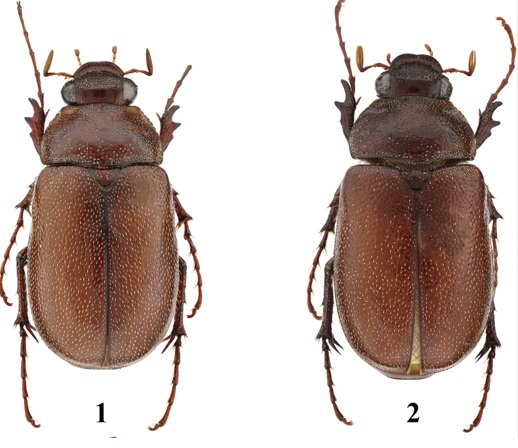
- 1: Male - 2: Female

Scientific classification
- Kingdom: Animalia
- Phylum: Arthropoda
- Clade: Pancrustacea
- Class: Insecta
- Order: Coleoptera
- Suborder: Polyphaga
- Infraorder: Scarabaeiformia
- Family: Scarabaeidae
- Tribe: Melolonthini
- Genus: Entyposis
- Species: E. frici

Binomial name
- Entyposis frici Bezděk & Sehnal, 2023

= Entyposis frici =

Species of beetle

Entyposis frici is a species of beetle of the family Scarabaeidae. It is found in Somalia.

== Description ==
Adults reach a length of about 13.3–13.6 mm (0.52–0.54 in). They have an elongate, strongly convex body. The surface is brown (with the appendages somewhat lighter), moderately shiny, and with pale setae. The head and pronotum are covered with short, stout, semi-erect setae and the elytra have nearly scale-like setation. The legs and ventral surface have sparse, long, erect setae mixed with much shorter, scale-like setae.

== Etymology ==
The name of the species is dedicated to Zdeněk Faltýnek Fric, a specialist in the phylogeny and ecology of butterflies, the collector of the type series.
