= Atysilla fallax =

Scientific classification
- Kingdom: Animalia
- Phylum: Arthropoda
- Clade: Pancrustacea
- Class: Insecta
- Order: Coleoptera
- Suborder: Polyphaga
- Infraorder: Scarabaeiformia
- Family: Scarabaeidae
- Genus: Atysilla
- Species: A. fallax

Binomial name
- Atysilla fallax (Péringuey, 1904)

Synonyms
- Atys fallax Péringuey, 1904

Species of beetle

Atysilla fallax is a species of beetle of the family Scarabaeidae. It is found in Zimbabwe.

== Description ==
Adults reach a length of about 11.5–12 mm (0.45–0.47 in). They are testaceous, slightly testaceous-red on the head and pronotum and with the antennae reddish-brown. The pronotum has moderately closely set punctures, even along the sides, while the punctures on the elytra are indistinctly setigerous and those on the pygidium are somewhat scattered.
