= Atysilla corrosa =

Scientific classification
- Kingdom: Animalia
- Phylum: Arthropoda
- Clade: Pancrustacea
- Class: Insecta
- Order: Coleoptera
- Suborder: Polyphaga
- Infraorder: Scarabaeiformia
- Family: Scarabaeidae
- Genus: Atysilla
- Species: A. corrosa

Binomial name
- Atysilla corrosa (Burmeister, 1855)

Synonyms
- Schizonycha corrosa Burmeister, 1855

Species of beetle

Atysilla corrosa is a species of beetle of the family Scarabaeidae. It is found in South Africa (Western Cape, Eastern Cape).

== Description ==
Adults reach a length of about 10.5 mm (0.41 in). They have an ovate, broad, dark chestnut-brown, coarsely but not very deeply punctate body. Each puncture has a small, yellow bristle. They are very broadly built, especially the pronotum, and on that account the head appears quite small.
