= Atysilla infans =

Scientific classification
- Kingdom: Animalia
- Phylum: Arthropoda
- Clade: Pancrustacea
- Class: Insecta
- Order: Coleoptera
- Suborder: Polyphaga
- Infraorder: Scarabaeiformia
- Family: Scarabaeidae
- Genus: Atysilla
- Species: A. infans

Binomial name
- Atysilla infans (Péringuey, 1904)

Synonyms
- Atys infans Péringuey, 1904; Schizonycha infans

Species of beetle

Atysilla infans is a species of beetle of the family Scarabaeidae. It is found in South Africa (KwaZulu-Natal, Gauteng).

== Description ==
Adults reach a length of about 10–10.5 mm (0.39–0.41 in). They are testaceous-red, with the elytra a little lighter. Each puncture on the upper side has an extremely minute hair.
