= Atysilla hybrida =

Scientific classification
- Kingdom: Animalia
- Phylum: Arthropoda
- Clade: Pancrustacea
- Class: Insecta
- Order: Coleoptera
- Suborder: Polyphaga
- Infraorder: Scarabaeiformia
- Family: Scarabaeidae
- Genus: Atysilla
- Species: A. hybrida

Binomial name
- Atysilla hybrida (Péringuey, 1904)

Synonyms
- Atys hybrida Péringuey, 1904; Schizonycha hybrida

Species of beetle

Atysilla hybrida is a species of beetle of the family Scarabaeidae. It is found in South Africa (KwaZulu-Natal, Limpopo).

== Description ==
Adults reach a length of about 10 mm (0.39 in). They have a sub-elongated, light testaceous body, with the head and anterior part of the pronotum darker, and the antennal club flavescent in males.
