= Dinacoma marginata =

Scientific classification
- Kingdom: Animalia
- Phylum: Arthropoda
- Clade: Pancrustacea
- Class: Insecta
- Order: Coleoptera
- Suborder: Polyphaga
- Infraorder: Scarabaeiformia
- Family: Scarabaeidae
- Tribe: Melolonthini
- Genus: Dinacoma
- Species: D. marginata

Binomial name
- Dinacoma marginata (Casey, 1887)

Synonyms
- Thyce marginata Casey, 1887

Species of beetle

Dinacoma marginata is a species of scarab beetle in the family Scarabaeidae. It is found in North America.
