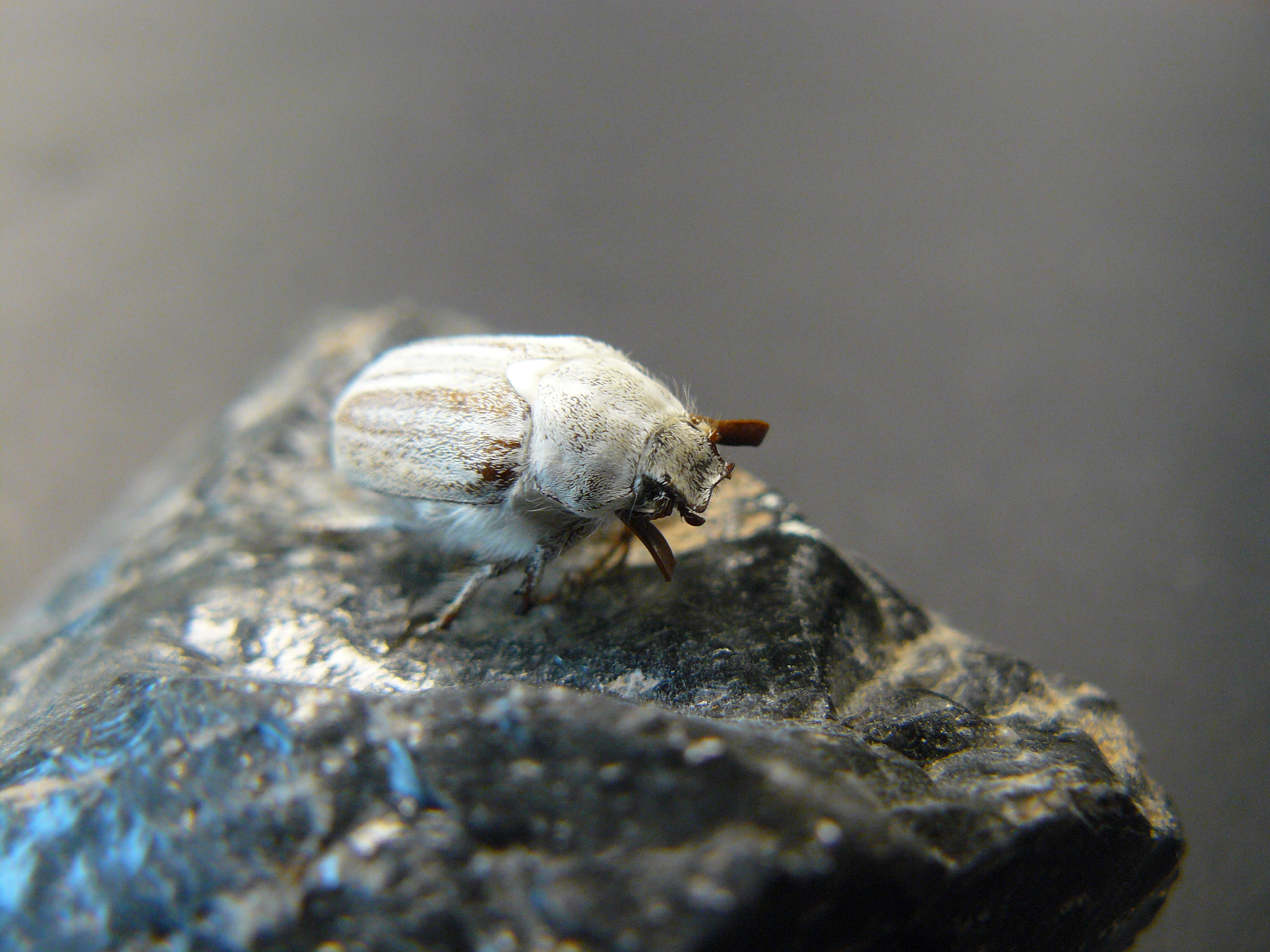

Conservation status
- Critically Imperiled (NatureServe)

- Endangered (ESA)

Scientific classification
- Kingdom: Animalia
- Phylum: Arthropoda
- Class: Insecta
- Order: Coleoptera
- Suborder: Polyphaga
- Infraorder: Scarabaeiformia
- Family: Scarabaeidae
- Genus: Dinacoma
- Species: D. caseyi

Binomial name
- Dinacoma caseyi Blaisdell 1930

= Casey's June beetle =

Species of beetle

Casey's June beetle, Dinacoma caseyi, is a beetle in the scarab family (Scarabaeidae). It is listed as an endangered species with approximately 587 acres (237 hectares) of land as critical habitat in Riverside County, California. Their habitation range is limited to Palm Canyon Walsh and Tahquitz Creek in Palm Springs.

== Taxonomy ==
Delbert La Rue, a researcher experienced with the genus Dinacoma and a taxonomic expert stated, "Dinacoma caseyi is a distinct species morphologically and comprises its own species group—the caseyi complex—the other [species group] being the marginata complex which includes the bulk/remainder of the genus". The Casey's June beetle was first collected in the city of Palm Springs, California, in 1916, and was later described by Blaisdell (1930, pp. 174–176) based on male specimens. This species measures 0.55 to 0.71 inches (1.4 to 1.8 cm) long, with dusty brown or whitish coloring, and brown and cream longitudinal stripes on the elytra (wing covers and back).The organism is also characterized by its "leaf-like plates" on its antenna which allow this species to detect scents in its habitat (Natural History).

== Biology ==
Based on surveys conducted to assess the species' presence, both male and female Casey's June beetles emerge from burrows in the alluvial sand sometime between late March and early June, with population peaks generally occurring in April and May. Females are always observed on the ground and are considered flightless. La Rue (2006, p. 1) stated that "Female Dinacoma are very rare in collections. Females display an accentuated sexual dimorphism characterized by an enlarged abdomen, reduced legs and antennae, and metathoracic wing reduction and venation. These characters are likely adaptations to flightlessness and a fossorial biology." During the active flight season, males emerge from the ground and begin flying near dusk. Males are reported to fly back and forth or crawl on the ground where a female beetle has been detected. Cornett (2003, p. 5) theorized that after emergence, females remain on the ground and release pheromones to attract flying males. After mating, females return to their burrows or dig a new burrow and deposit eggs. Excavations of adult emergence burrows revealed pupal exuviae (casings) at depths ranging from approximately 4 to 6 in (10 to 16 cm).

The larval cycle for the species is likely one year, based on the absence of larvae (grubs) in burrows during the adult flight season. The food source for Casey's June beetle larvae while underground is unknown, but other species of June beetle are known to eat "plant roots or plant detritus and associated decay organisms". La Rue (2006, pp. 1–2) stated, "[Casey's June beetle] exhibits no specific host preferences, and larvae likely consume any available organic resources— including [layered organic debris]— encountered within the alluvial habitat." Specific host plant associations for Casey's June beetle are not known. Although visual surveys have detected a concentration of emergence burrows in the vicinity of a number of species of woody shrub in Palm Canyon Wash, this may be due to low soil disturbance by vehicles, foot traffic, and horses near woody vegetation.

== Recovery Efforts ==
Since September 22, 2011 the species has been listed as endangered, however, efforts within the city of Palm Springs, California, have been made in order to help conserve the species and prevent its extinction. According to the recovery plans from the U.S Fish & Wildlife Service, the biggest threat to the species has been the drastic change to their habitat. Significant threats to Casey's June beetle include urban development, off-road vehicles, and lighting deriving from urban structures and vehicles. Urban development has negative effects on Casey's June beetle because it reduces inhabitable areas the beetle can occupy, contributes to pesticide and fertilizer run-off, and light pollution that results in increased deaths of the June beetle. Despite changes within the habitat, the organism is also a food source to birds within the Riverside County (U.S Fish & Wildlife Service). A significant amount of the species population is located within Smoke Tree Ranch, a historic property within Palm Springs. This property provides the vegetation and soil necessary for the species to survive. The ranch is one of the only ranges within their habitat that has been deemed with permanent protection. Efforts to maintain the species habitat from construction and lack of vegetation continue, yet is something that the U.S Fish & Wildlife Service continue to protect.
