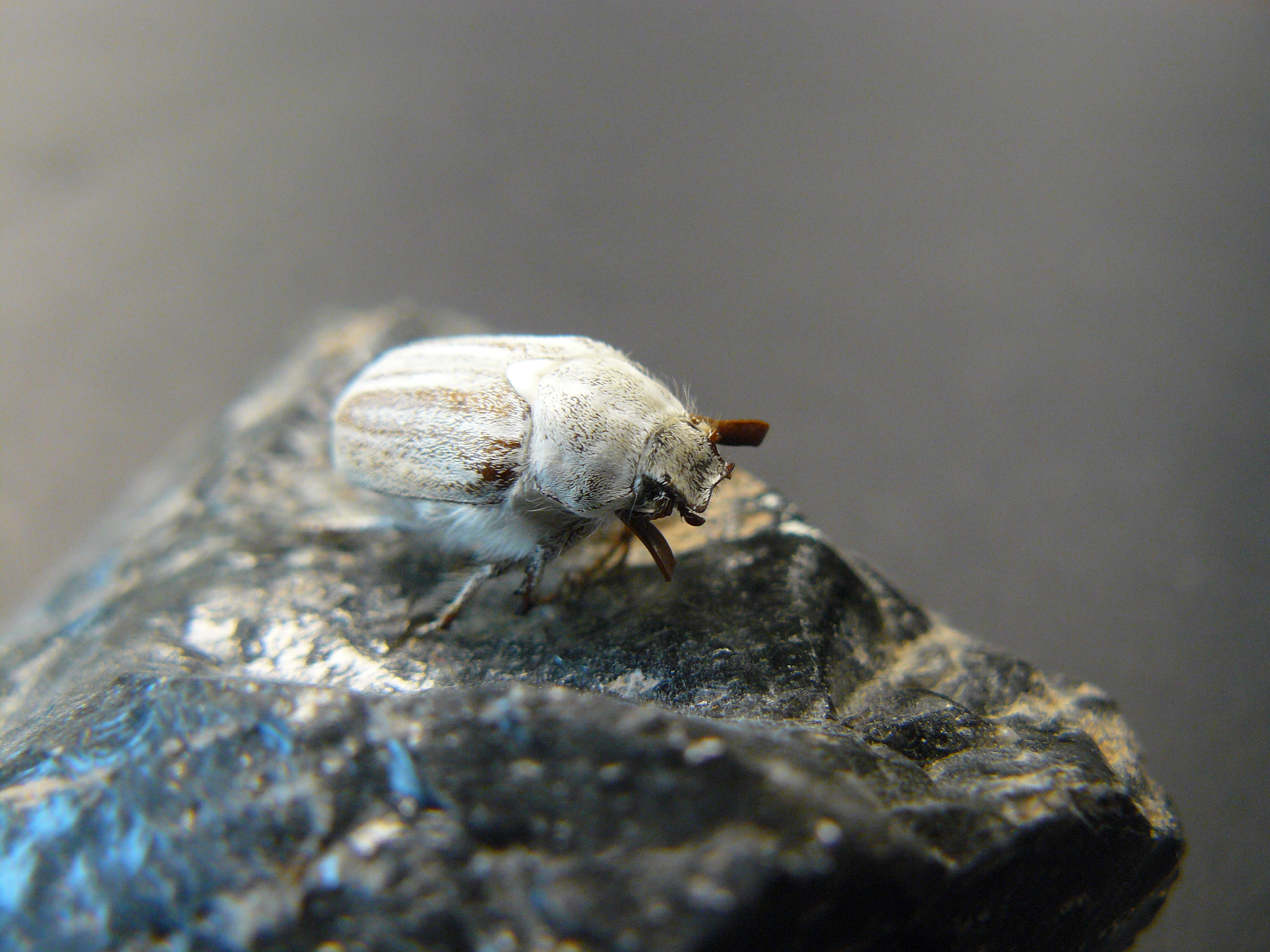
- Dinacoma caseyi

Scientific classification
- Kingdom: Animalia
- Phylum: Arthropoda
- Clade: Pancrustacea
- Class: Insecta
- Order: Coleoptera
- Suborder: Polyphaga
- Infraorder: Scarabaeiformia
- Superfamily: Scarabaeoidea
- Family: Scarabaeidae
- Subfamily: Melolonthinae
- Tribe: Melolonthini
- Genus: Dinacoma; Casey, 1889

Species
- see text

= Dinacoma =

Genus of beetles

Dinacoma is a small genus of beetles in the scarab family (Scarabaeidae).

== Species ==
- D. caseyi Blaisdell, 1930
- D. marginata (Casey, 1887)
- D. sanfelipe Gillett, Osborne, Reil, & Rubinoff, 2020

In 2006, entomologists indicated that there were two apparently new species or subspecies of Dinacoma, collected respectively from near the city of Hemet, California, and in the northwest portion of Joshua Tree National Park, California, at Covington Flats. As of 2022, these specimens of Dinacoma have not been formally described in the scientific literature, but expert evaluation places them in the Dinacoma marginata species group. La Rue (2006, p. 2) stated that Dinacoma caseyi is the most morphologically divergent and distinct species in the genus. The new specimens collected from the Hemet area are paler than Casey's June beetle specimens and possess morphologically different genitalia. Furthermore, the Little San Bernardino Mountains geographically isolate the new Dinacoma Joshua Tree population from all other known Dinacoma species.
