= List of lakes of Vietnam =

The following is a list of Lakes in Vietnam.

- Ayun Hạ Reservoir
- Ba Mẫu Lake
- Ba Bể Lake
- Biển Hồ Lake
- Bảy Mẫu Lake
- Búng Bình Thiên
- Dầu Tiếng Lake
- Giảng Võ Lake
- Lakes in Hanoi (Các hồ tại Hà Nội):
- Hoàn Kiếm Lake
- Núi Cốc Lake
- Phú Ninh Lake
- Thiền Quang Lake
- Trúc Bạch Lake
- West Lake
- Xuân Hương Lake
- Định Bình Lake

== See also ==
- List of lakes
- Lists of lakes
