= Phu Ninh =

Phu Ninh may refer to several populated places in Vietnam:

- Phú Ninh District, a rural district of Quảng Nam Province
- Phù Ninh District, a rural district of Phú Thọ Province
- Phù Ninh, Haiphong, a commune of Thủy Nguyên District
- Phù Ninh, Phú Thọ, a commune of Phù Ninh District
