= Quảng Nam province =

Former province of Vietnam

Quảng Nam province Tỉnh Quảng Nam
- Province
- Quảng Nam province
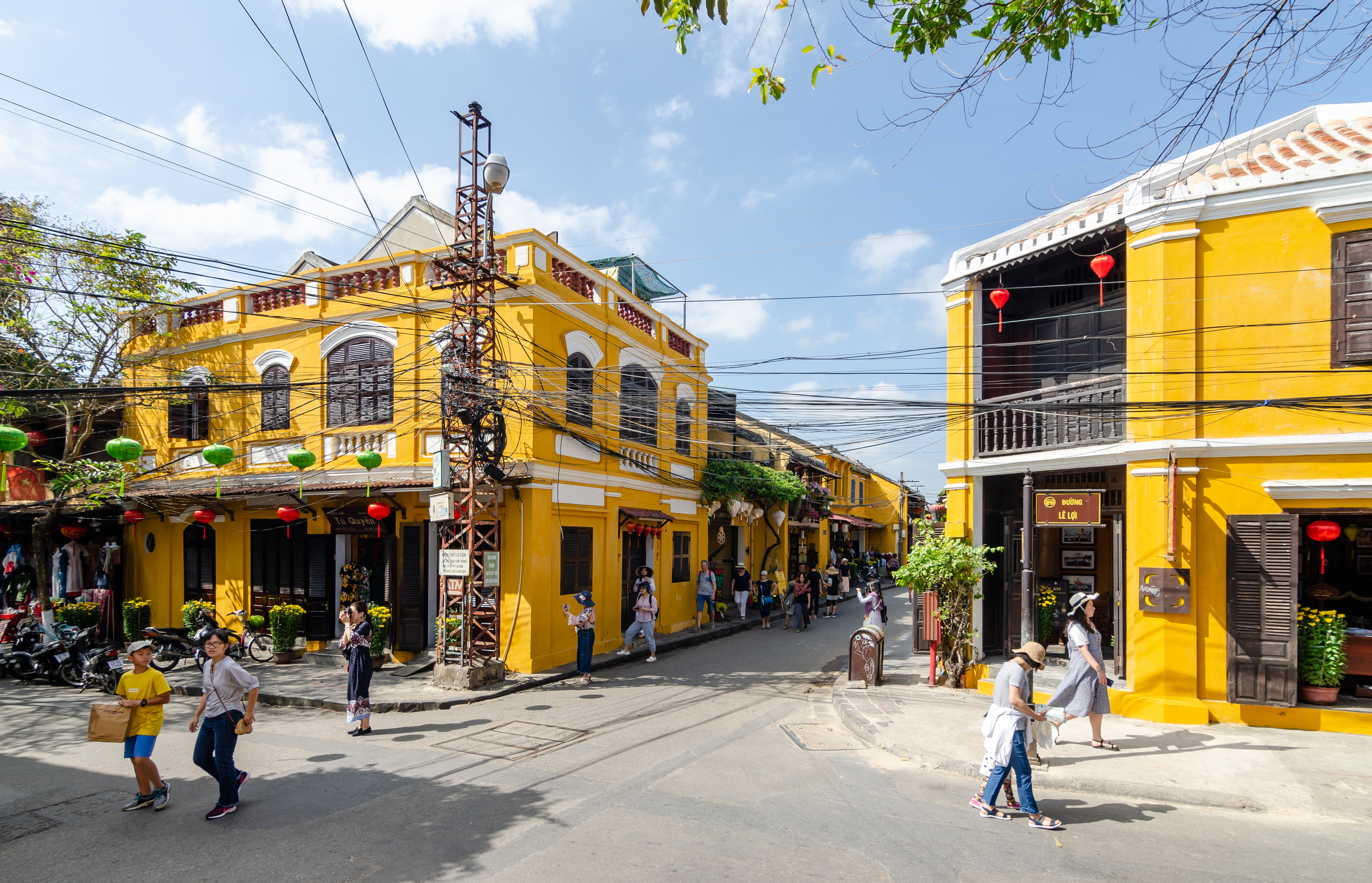
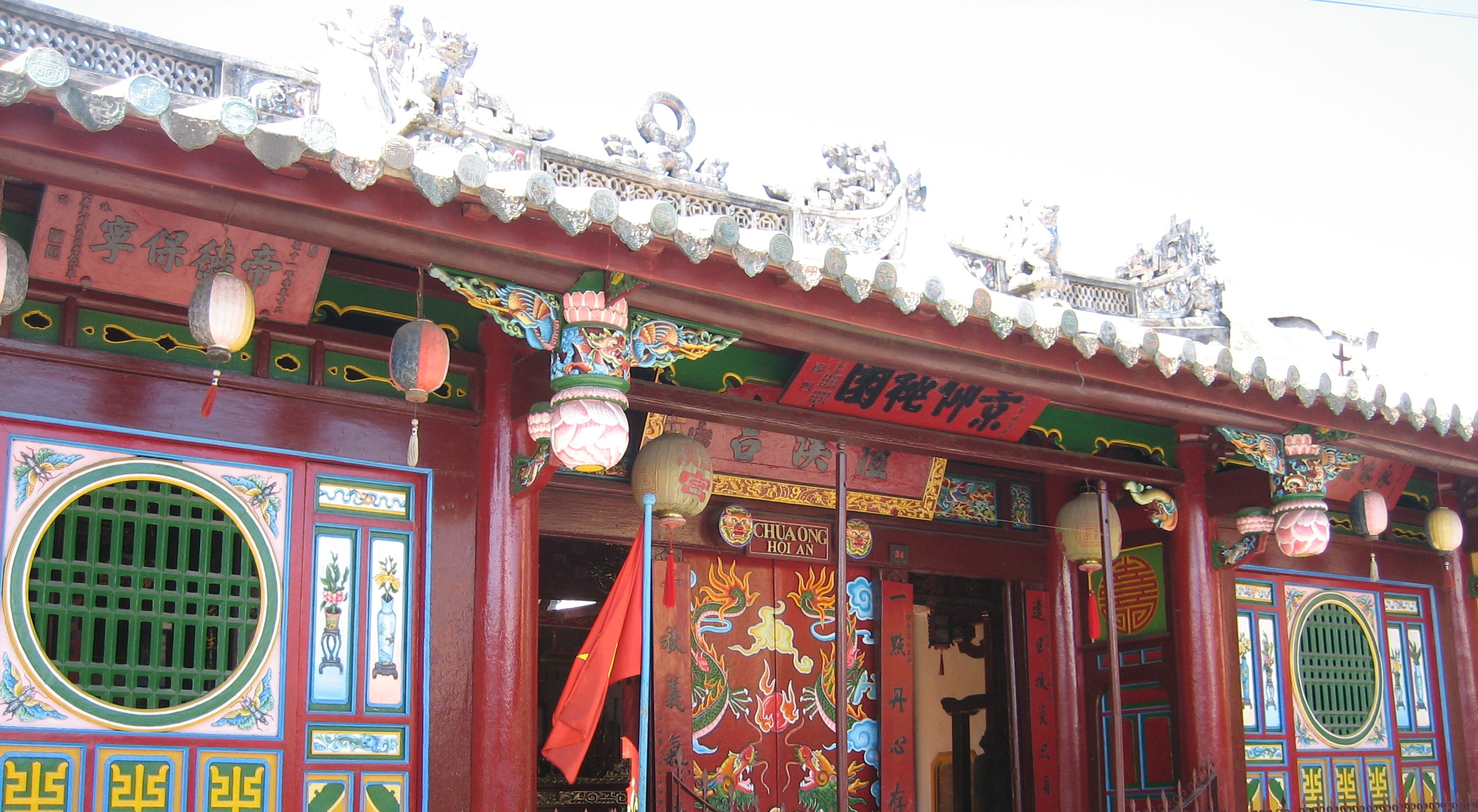
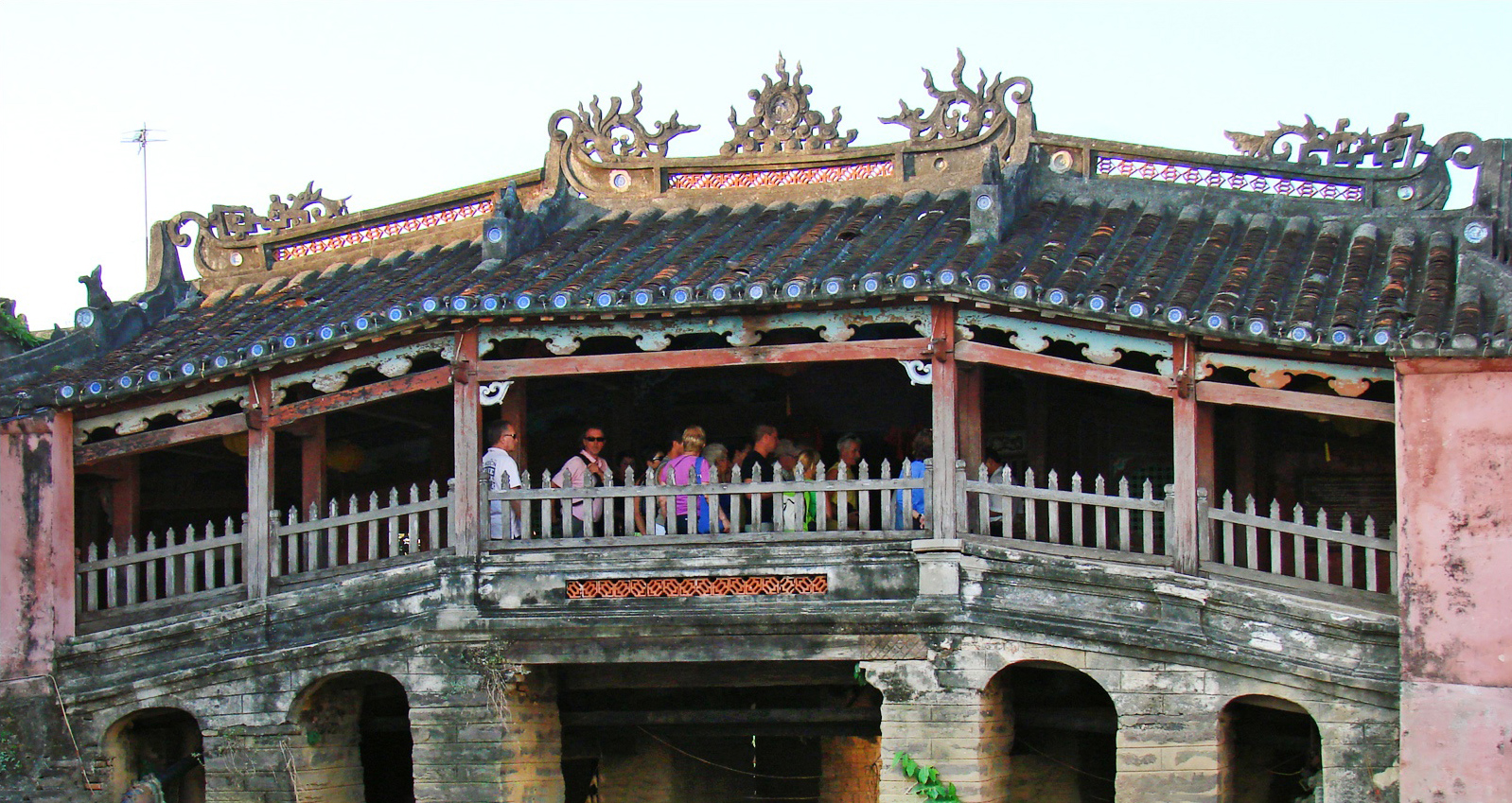
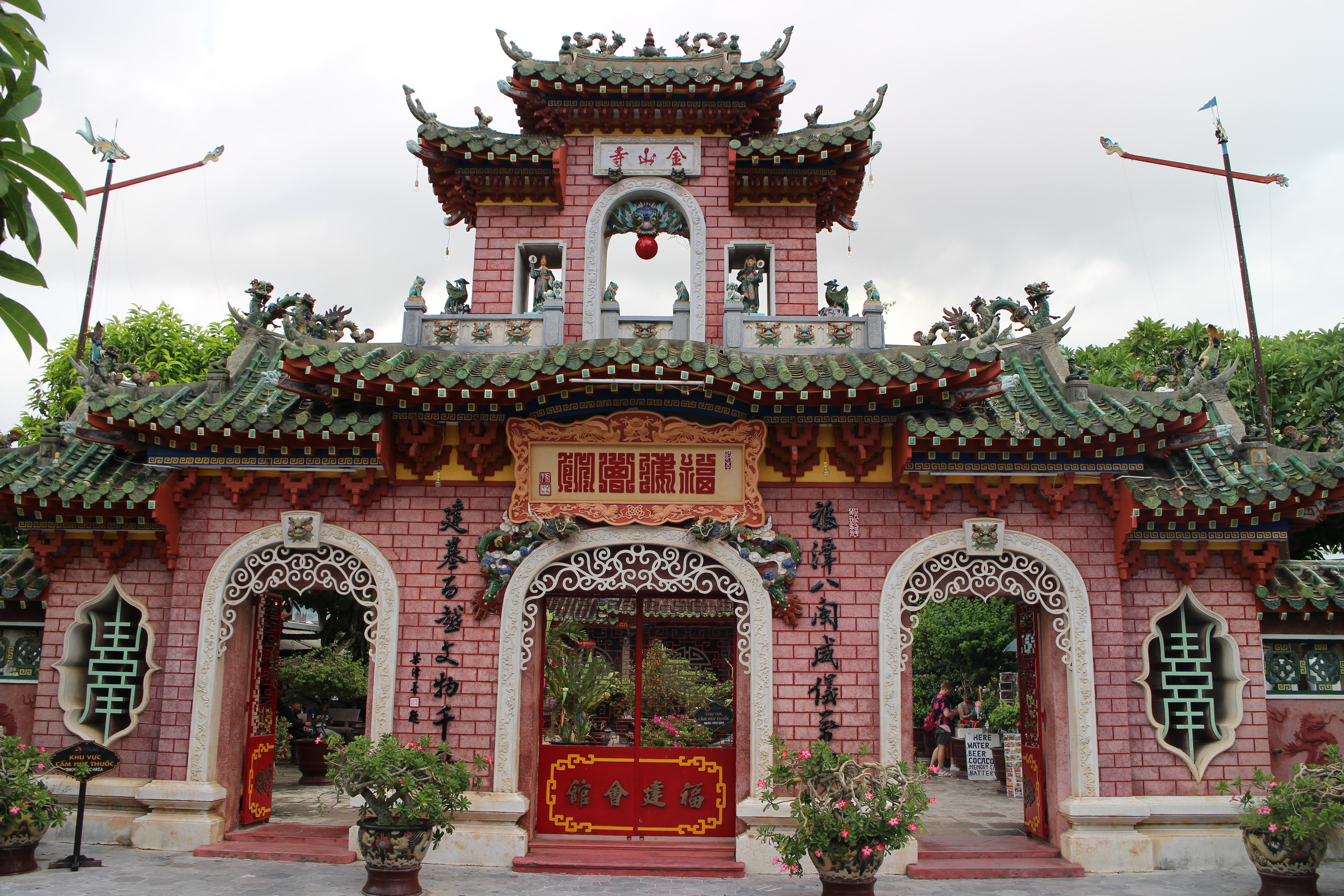
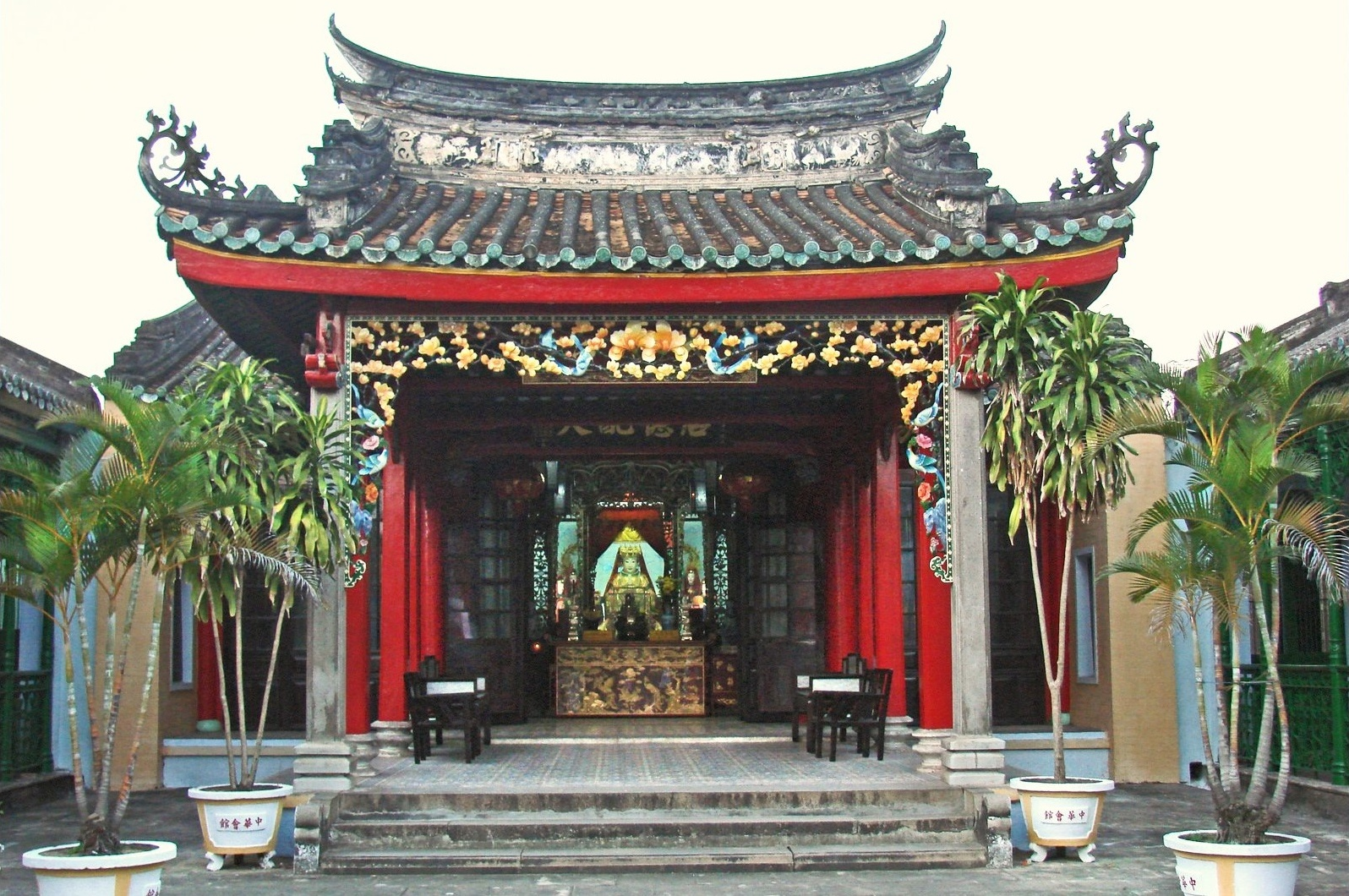
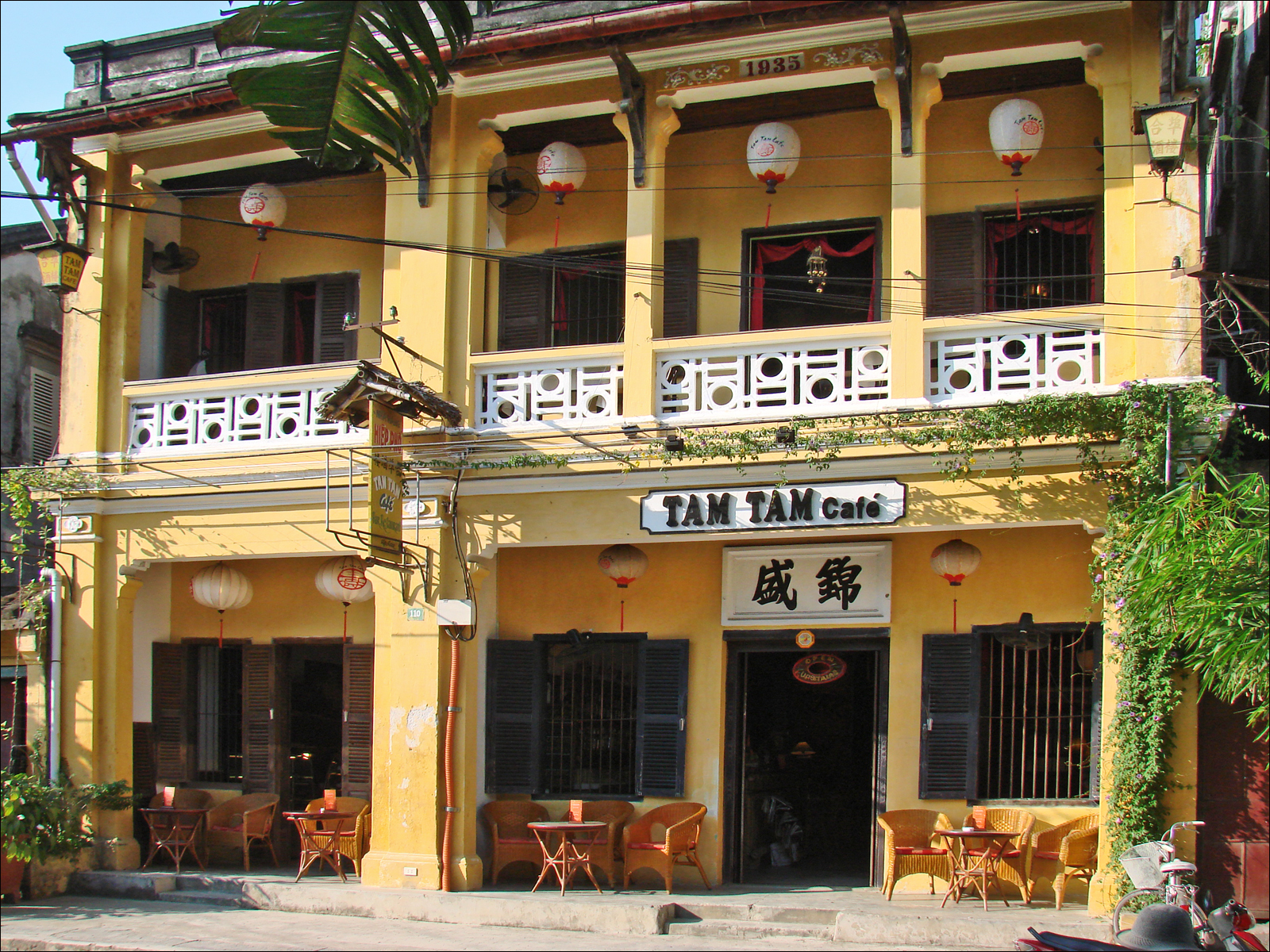
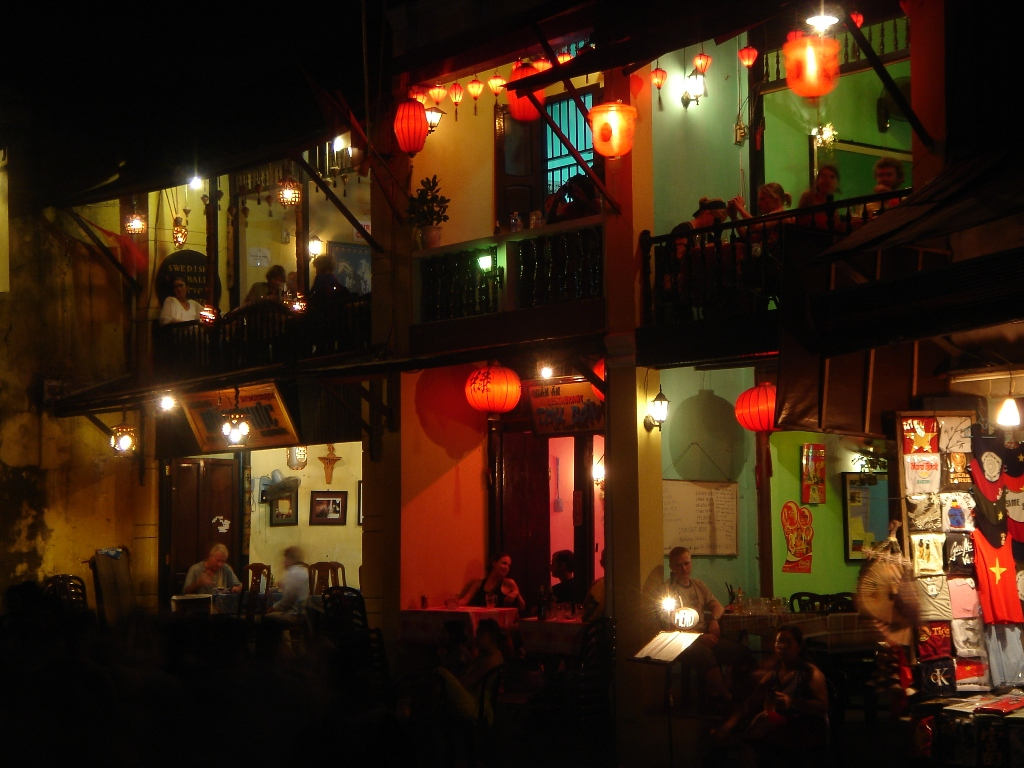
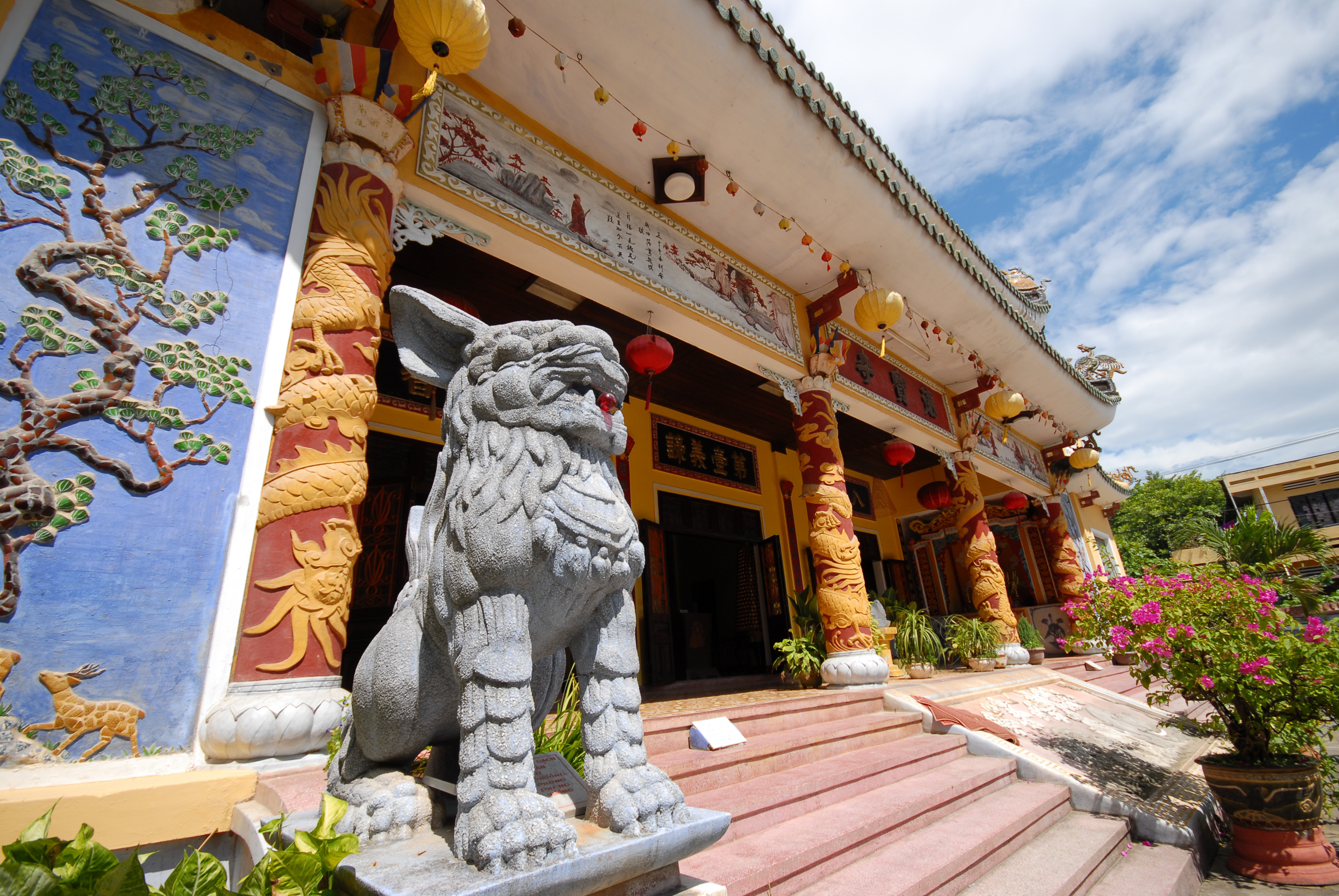
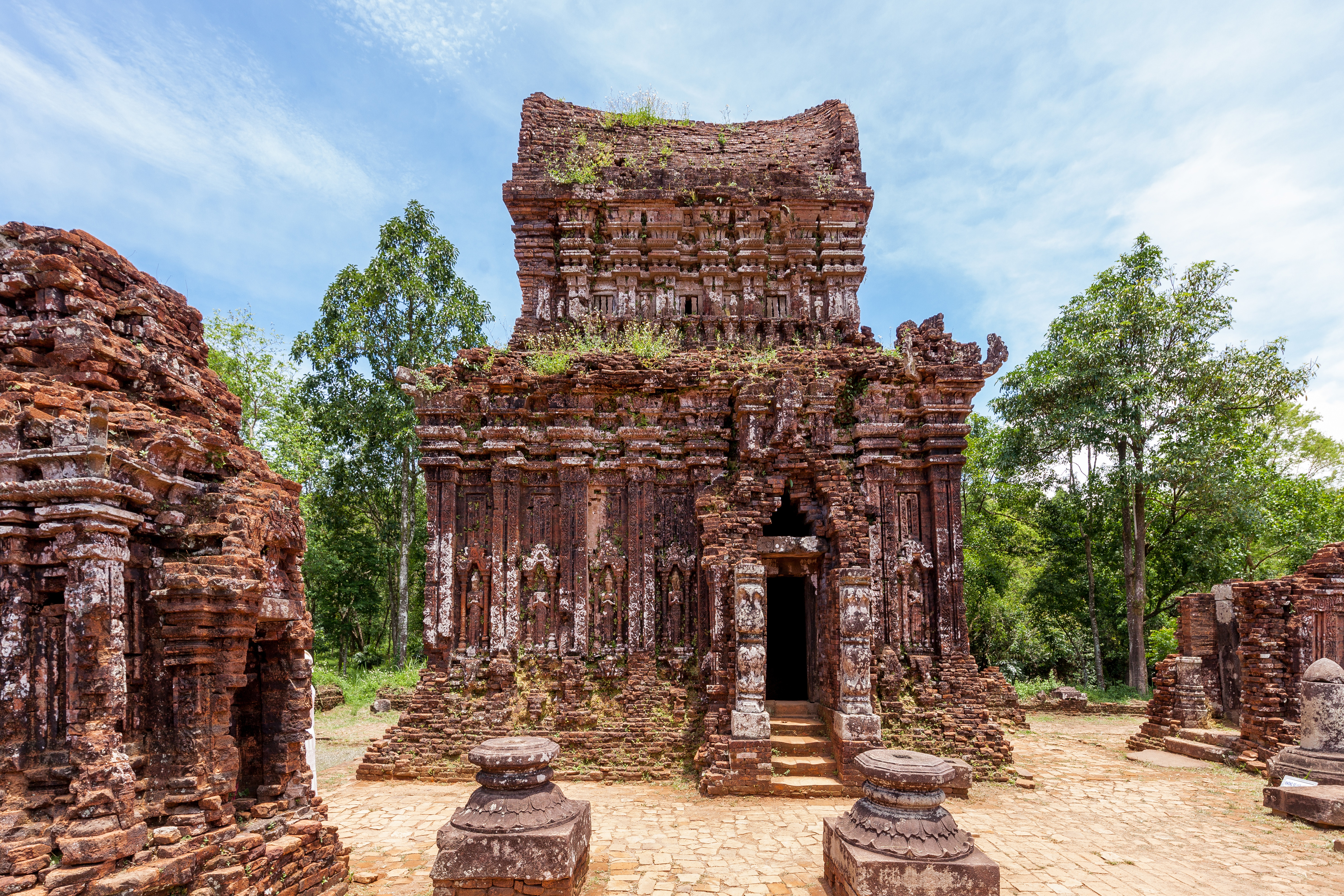
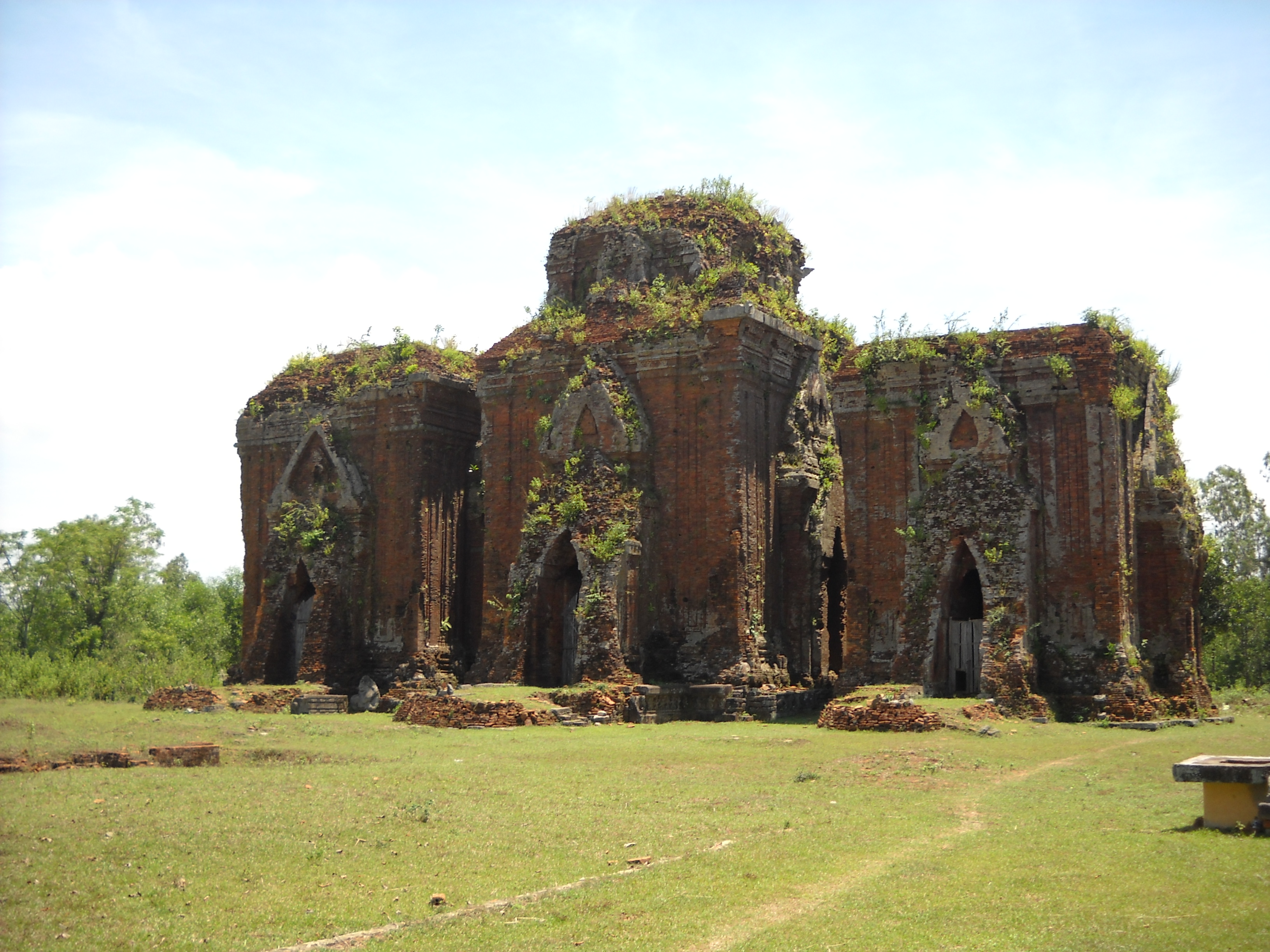
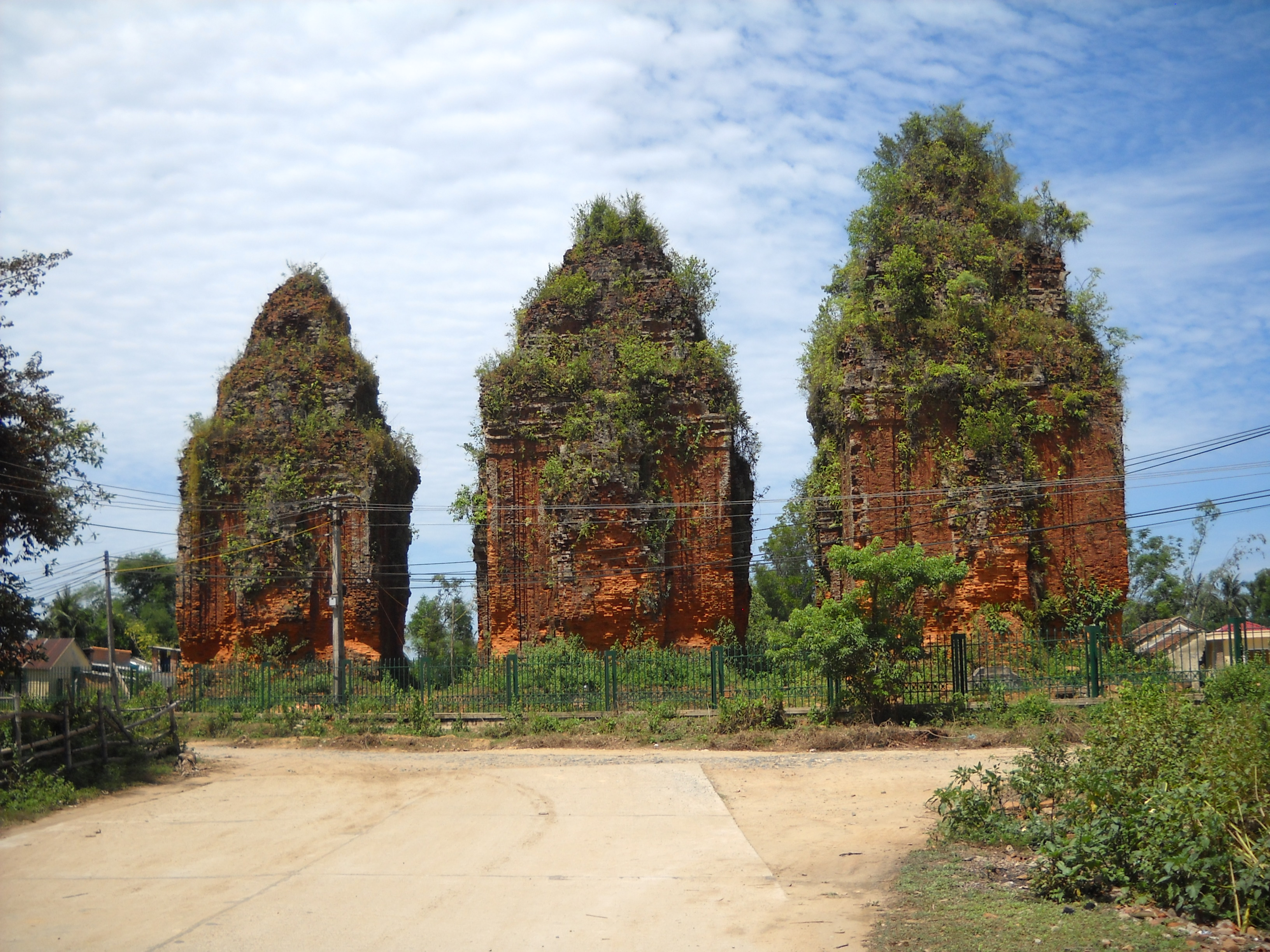
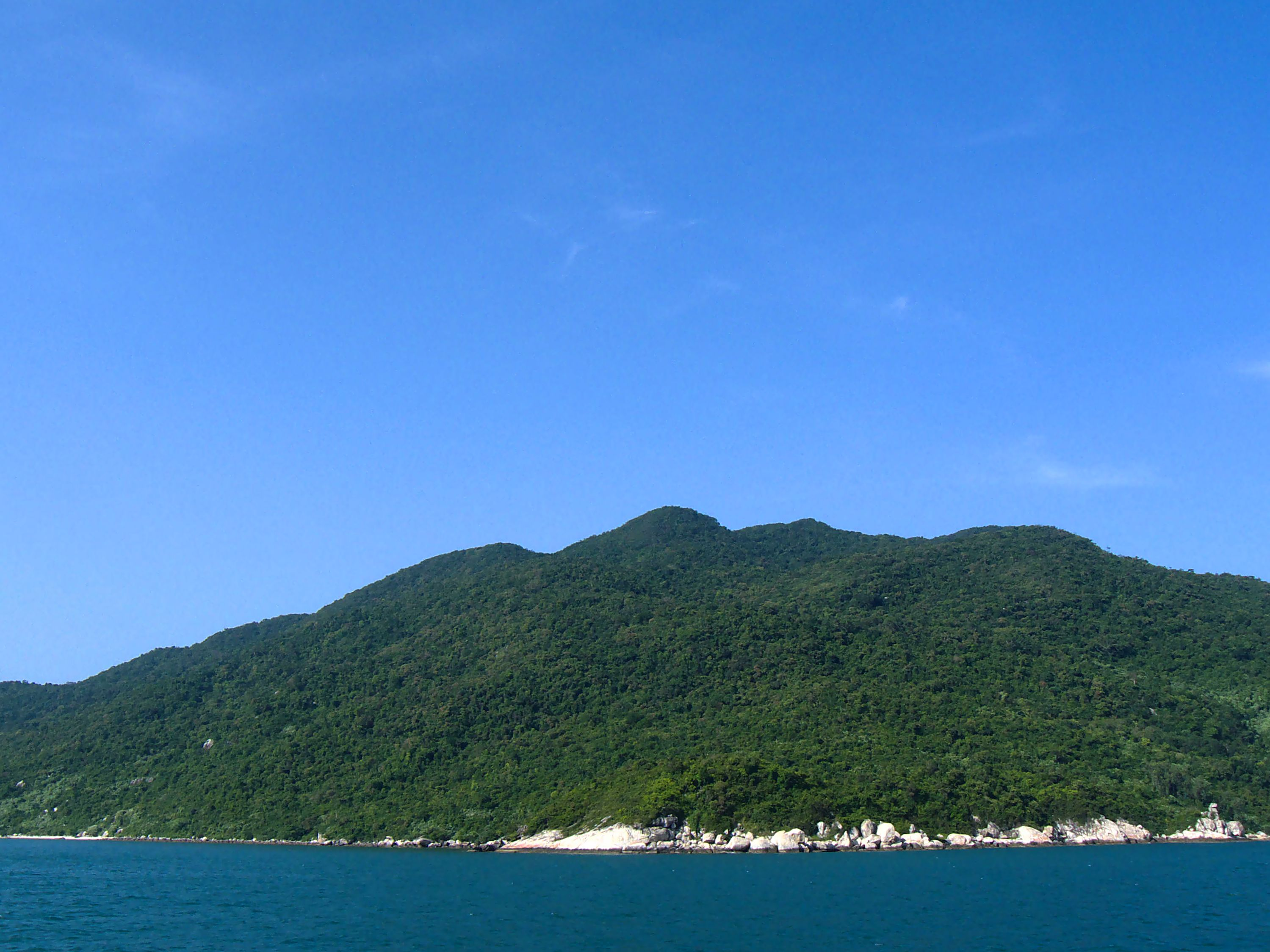
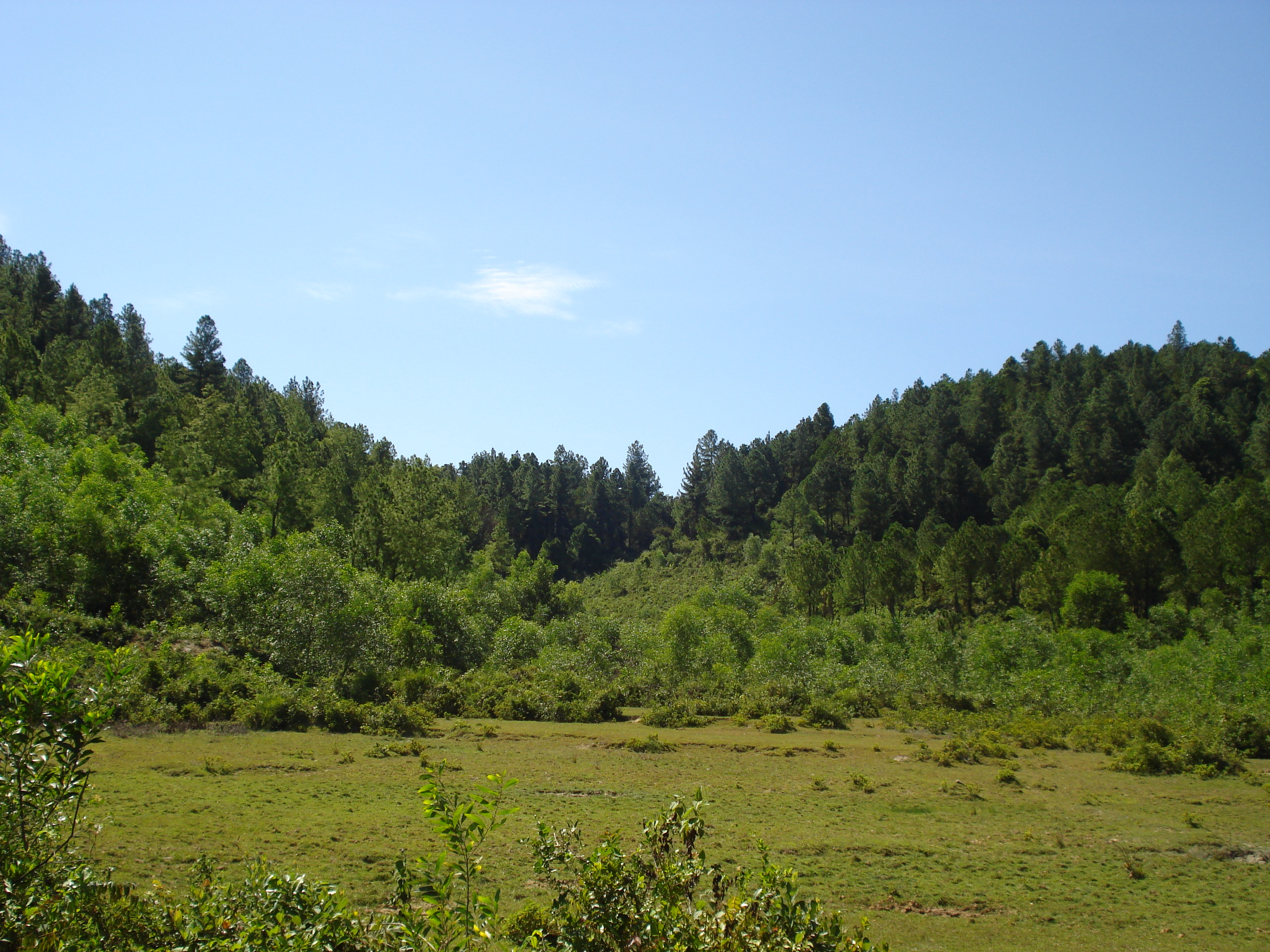
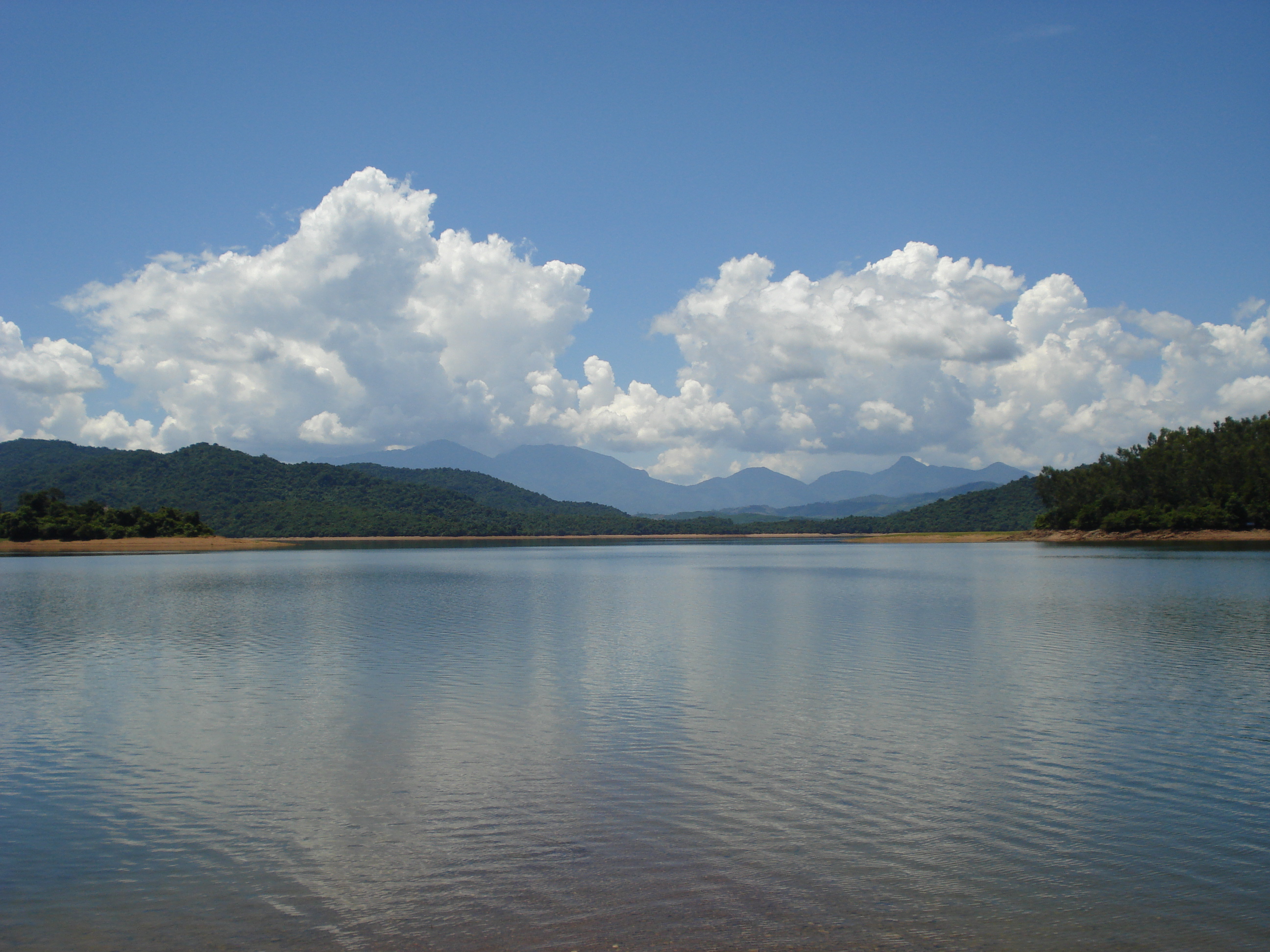
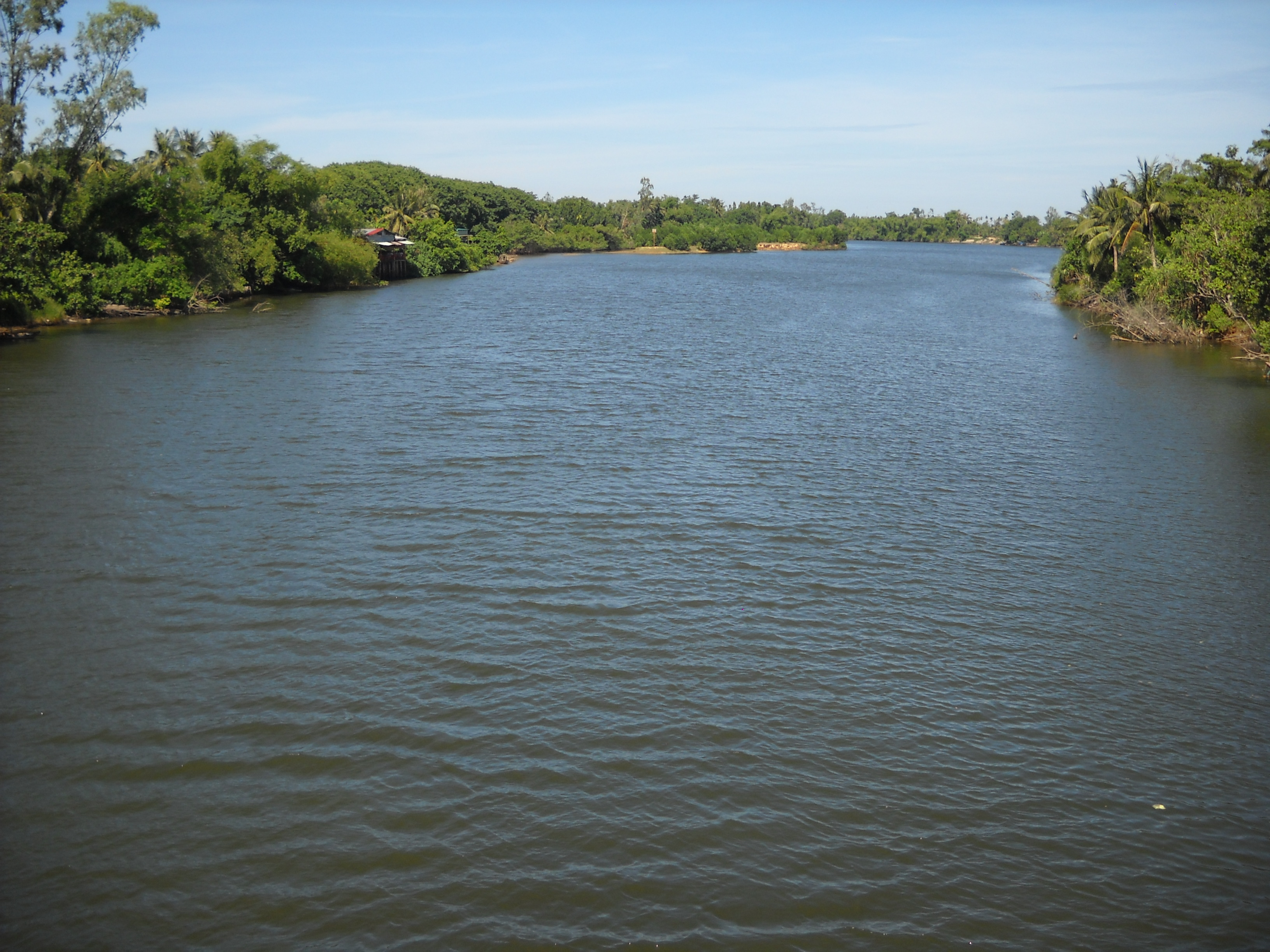
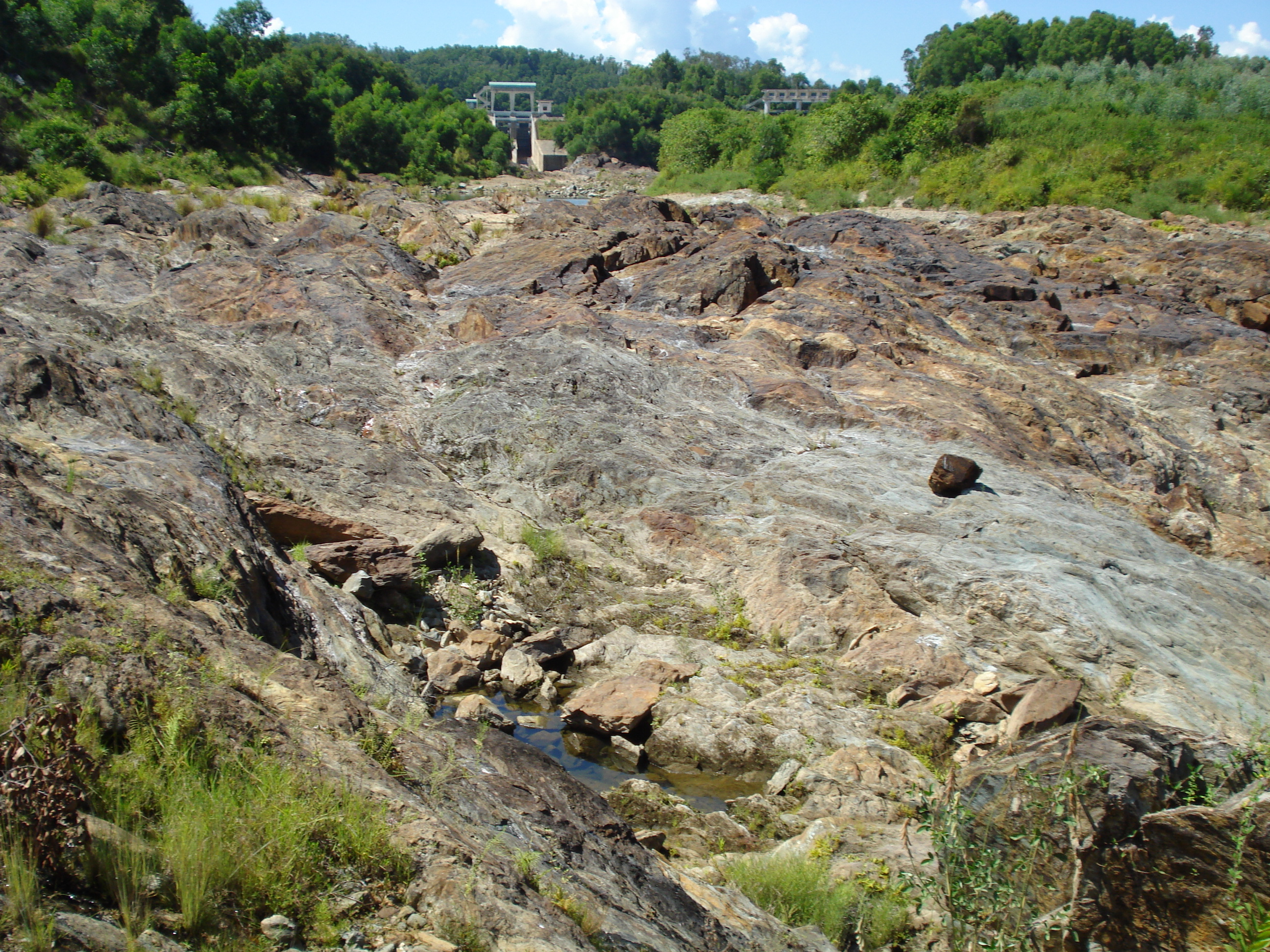
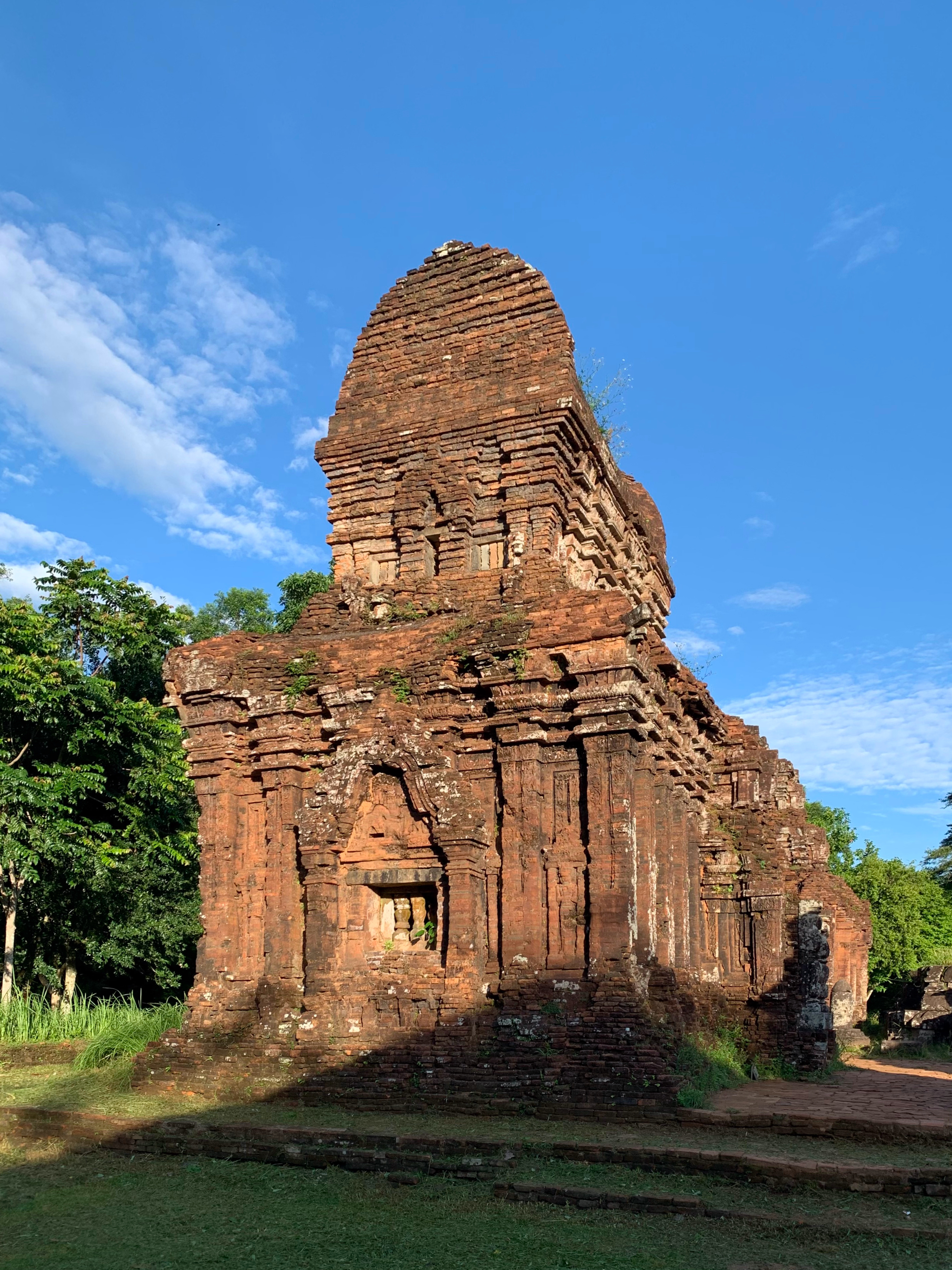
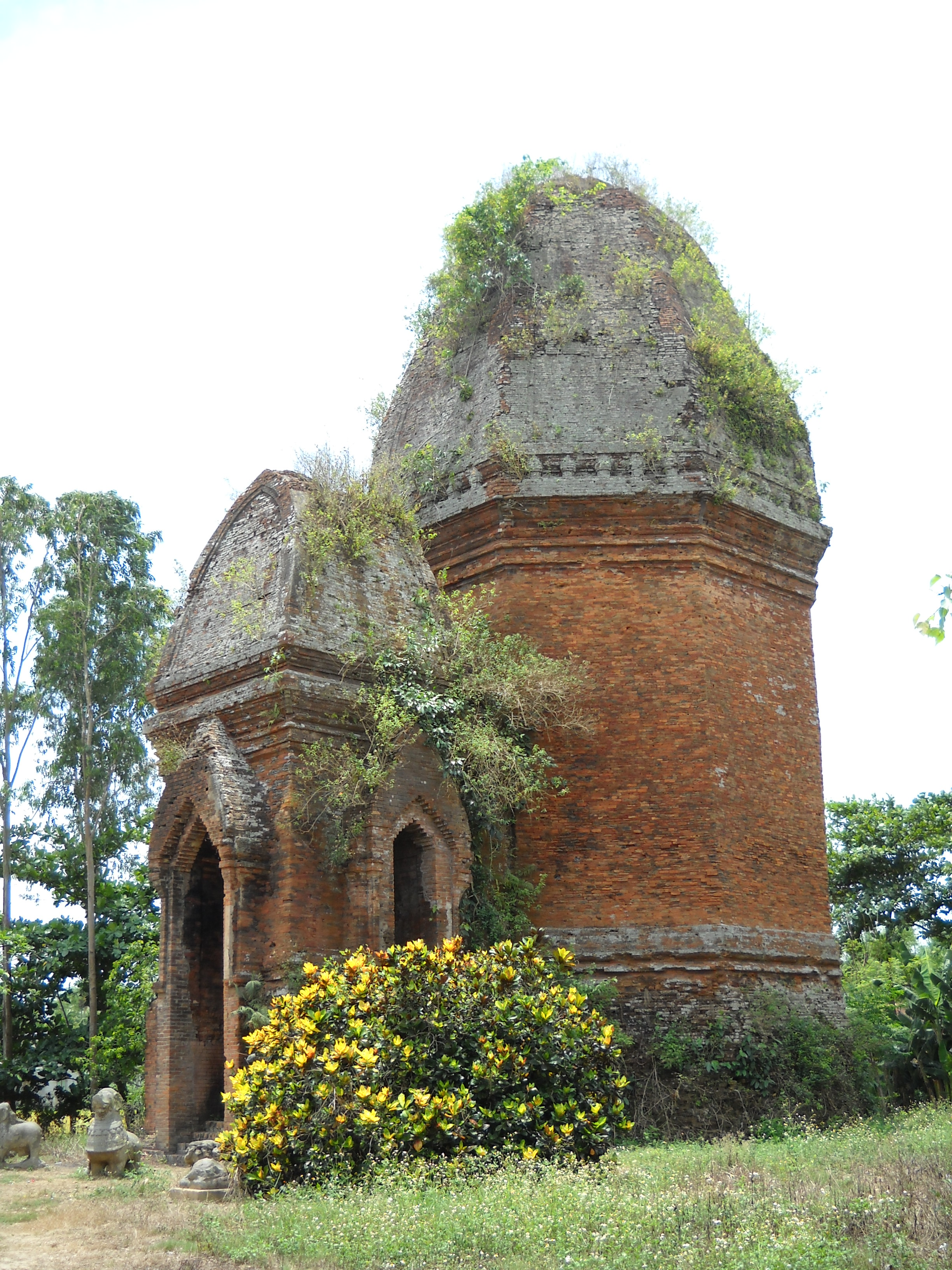
- Hội An wreck • Mỹ Sơn Tower • Chiên Đàn Tower • Khương Mỹ Tower • Cù Lao Chàm Marine Park • Phú Ninh Lake • Tam Kỳ River • Bằng An Tower

- Seal

- Coordinates: 15.55°N 108.05°E
- Country: Vietnam
- Region: South Central Coast
- Founded as Quảng Nam: 1471
- Split from Quảng Nam – Đà Nẵng province (or Quang Da province): 1997
- Merged into Đà Nẵng City: 2025
- Capital: Tam Kỳ
- Divisions: 2 provincial cities, 1 town, 15 counties

Government
  - Type: single-party system
  - Provincial Party Secretary: (Lương Nguyễn Minh Triết)
  - Chairman of the Vietnamese Fatherland Front: Lê Trí Thanh
  - Chairman of the People's Council: Nguyễn Đức Dũng
  - Chairman of the People's Committee: Lê Văn Dũng

Area
  - Total: 10,574.86 km^{2} (4,082.98 sq mi)

Population (2025)
  - Total: 1,747,147
  - Density: 165.2170/km^{2} (427.9102/sq mi)

Demographics
  - Ethnicities: Kinh, Hoa, Cơ Tu, Xơ Đăng, Giẻ Triêng, Co, Chăm

GDP
  - Total: VND 91.677 trillion US$ 3.915 billion
- Time zone: UTC+7 (ICT)
- Area codes: 235
- ISO 3166 code: VN-27
- HDI (2020): ▲0.728 (22nd)
- Website: www.quangnam.gov.vn

Quảng Nam (Vietnamese: [kwaːŋ˧˩ naːm˧˧]) was formerly a coastal province near northernmost part of the South Central Coast region, the Central of Vietnam. It borders Huế to the north, Đà Nẵng to the northeast, Kon Tum to the southwest, Quảng Ngãi to the southeast, Sekong of Laos to the west and the South China Sea to the east. Quảng Nam is located in the key economic region of Central Vietnam. In 1997, the province was re-established by separating Quảng Nam - Da Nang province (also known as Quảng Đà province) into two administrative units: Quảng Nam province and Da Nang city. Currently, the province counts two cities: Tam Kỳ (the provincial capital) and Hội An. Quảng Nam is the province with the most world cultural heritage sites in Vietnam, with two world cultural heritages recognized by UNESCO: Hội An ancient town and Mỹ Sơn sanctuary. In addition, the province is the birthplace of several people with important contributions to Vietnam. This is also the only province in the South Central Coast region that borders both the South China Sea and Laos, and has an international border gate.

On 12 June 2025, Quảng Nam was incorporated into Da Nang city.

== Name ==
Through the ups and downs of the Vietnamese people, the name Quang Nam has changed many times: from Dao Thua tuyen Quang Nam to Quang Nam land, Quang Nam town, Quang Nam palace in ancient times, then Quang Da special zone during the war against the US, Quang Nam - Da Nang province (Quang Da province) after the country's unification and returned to the old name Quang Nam province when the province was re-established in 1997 on the basis of separating Quang Nam - Da Nang province (also known as Quang Da province) into 2 administrative units: Quang Nam province and Da Nang city. In 1471, with the event of King Le Thanh Tong establishing Thua tuyen Quang Nam. King Le Thanh Tong affirmed the territorial sovereignty of Dai Viet over this land. King Le Thanh Tong made a choice, an orientation of great historical significance in the long-term development process of the Vietnamese people and strategic significance in terms of vision, development trend, which had a decisive meaning for the destiny of Dai Viet nation at that time. Therefore, it is not by chance that this famously learned king chose two meaningful words to name the new land: "Quang" means to expand, "Nam" means to the South, so the name "Quang Nam" means "expanding to the South".

== History ==
Human habitation in the province has been continuous for 2,200 years, starting with the Sa Huỳnh culture.

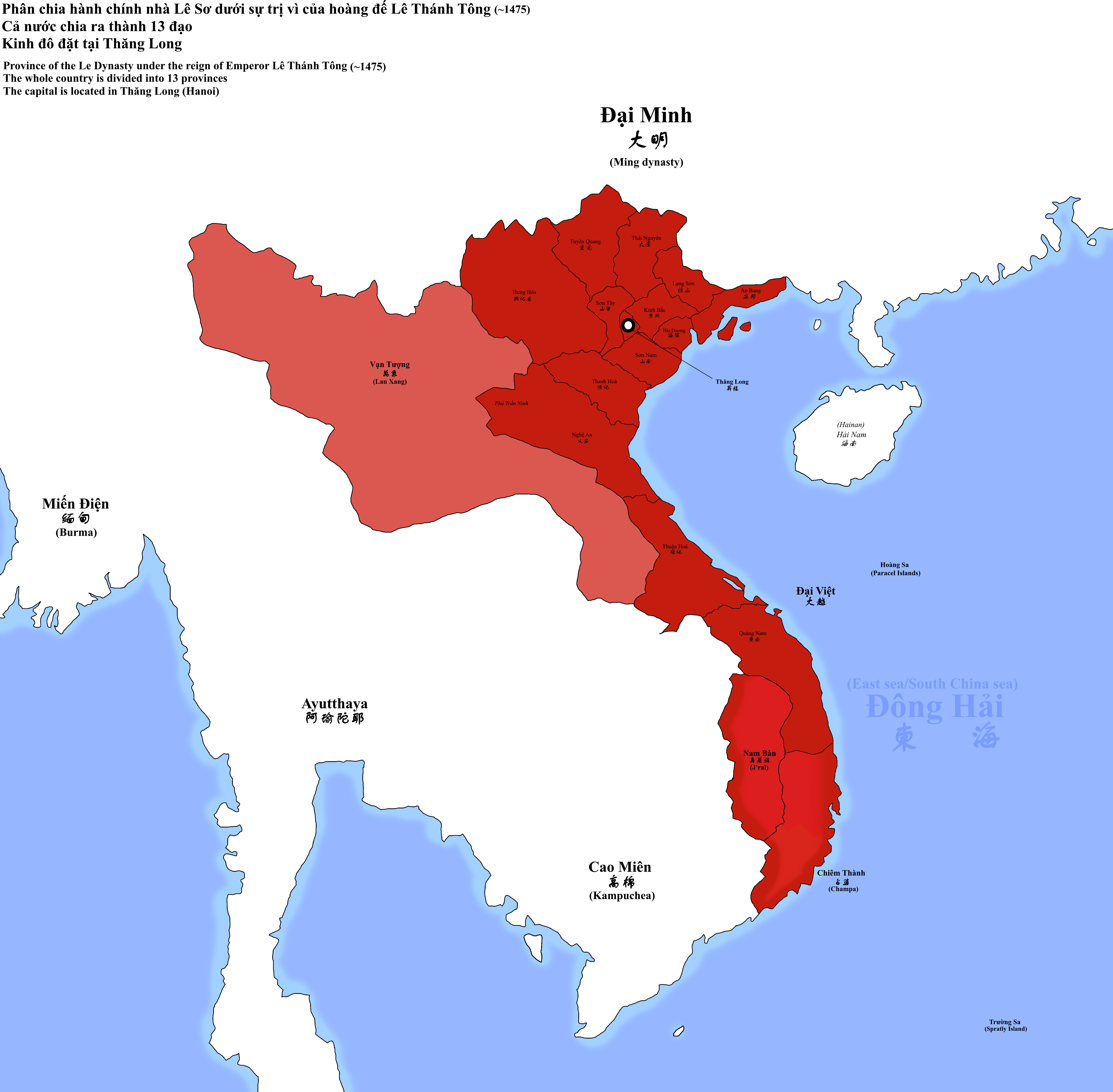
Regions of the Lê Dynasty under Emperor Lê Thánh Tông (~1475)

Quảng Nam was once part of the Kingdom of Champa (aka Chiêm Thành). In 1402, after usurping the throne from the Trần Dynasty, Hồ Quý Ly conquered Champa and annexed the territories of Chiêm Động and Cổ Lũy, organizing them into four districts: Thăng – Hoa, and Tư – Nghĩa. In 1471, following a decisive victory over Champa, King Lê Thánh Tông reoccupied Hóa Châu, annexed the lands of Chiêm Động, Đồ Bàn, Đại Chiêm, and Cổ Lũy to establish Quảng Nam protectorate (Đạo Quảng Nam) with three prefectures: Thăng Hoa, Tư Nghĩa, and Hoài Nhân (today Quảng Nam, Quảng Ngãi, and Bình Định provinces respectively). In the year Canh Tuất (1490), King Lê Thánh Tông divided the country into thirteen Regions (Xứ), with Quảng Nam was the southernmost one.

For some time both the most powerful city-state and the busiest Cham port (at Hội An) were located in what is now Quảng Nam. Trade in luxury goods from the Central Highlands was the basis of this wealth and power. As a result of warfare with Vietnam, the centre of political power of the Cham shifted south to Vijaya. The trade in luxuries continued for some time under the Nguyễn lords but declined gradually, especially under the Nguyễn dynasty and further in colonial Vietnam, when the economic focus shifted to the agriculture of the large river deltas.

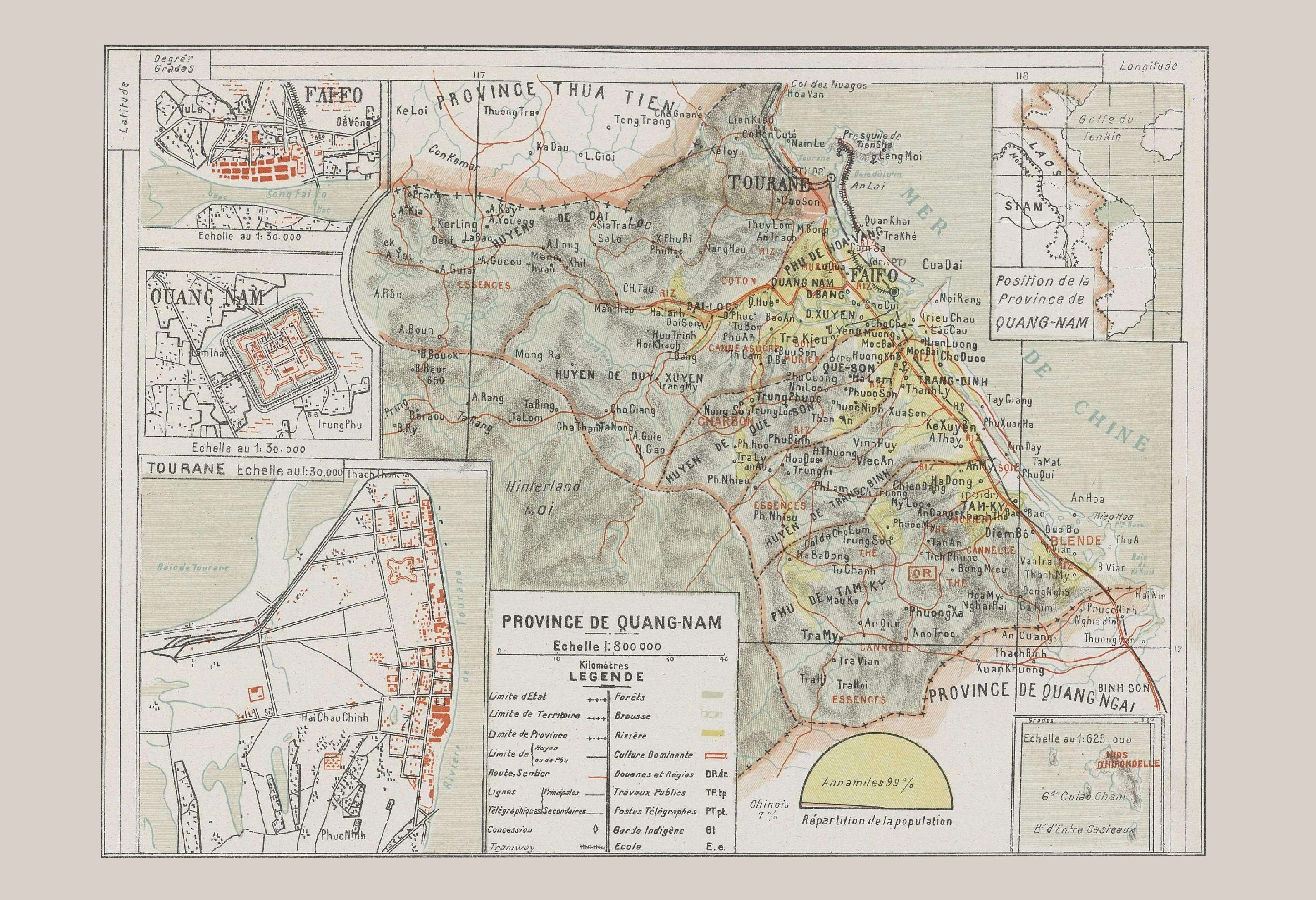
Quảng Nam province in 1909

As the site contained several mountain passes, it has historically been a center for conflict between ruling powers and dynastic struggles. The site was the scene of heavy inter-dynastic fighting between the Trịnh–Nguyễn War and the point in which the Nguyen dynasty had escaped following their expulsion from their strongholds in the north. Its primary city of Hội An was destroyed and rebuilt during the Tay Son rebellion.

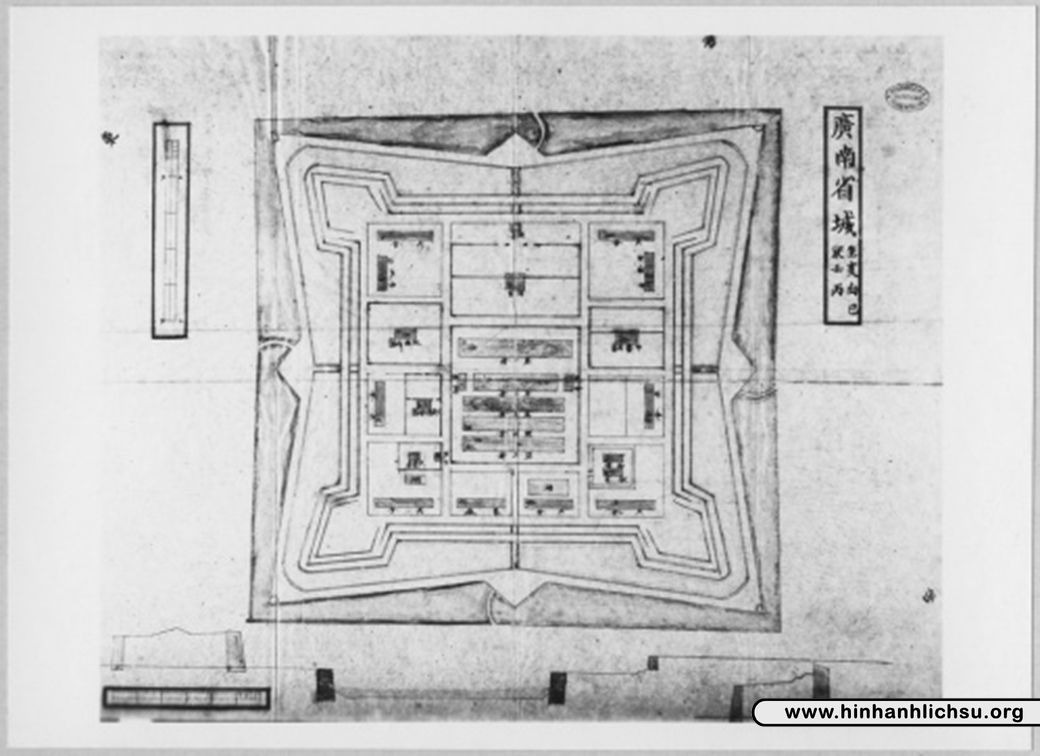
La Qua (Quảng Nam) citadel during the Nguyễn dynasty

The province of Quảng Nam has historically served as a trade site and was a major port region in Southeast Asia for trading high-grade silk, fabrics, paper, porcelain, areca nuts, pepper, Chinese medicines, elephant tusks, beeswax, mother-of-pearl and lacquer. The Dutch brought Vietnamese slaves they captured from Nguyễn lord territories in Quảng Nam province to their colony in Taiwan.

Quảng Nam and Quảng Tín in ARVN I Corps 1965

As a trade hub, Quảng Nam would also serve as the site where Western influence would enter into Vietnam. Notably Alexandre de Rhodes who had written the alphabet, and also where a military alliance with France was signed between Nguyen dynasty monarchs fleeing the Tay Son Rebellion. The region would also see the start of French colonization during Cochinchina campaign and the Siege of Tourane.

The province was split into two in 1962, with the southern half known as Quảng Tín province. The province was also the site of heavy fightings during the Vietnam War between the US Army 1st Cavalry Division, USMC III Marine Expeditionary Force, ROK Marines 2nd Division and ARVN Airborne Division against the PAVN 2nd Division (Quảng Đà ), such as Battle of Trà Bình, Operation Union, Operation Wheeler/Wallowa in 1967, and Battle of Thượng Đức in 1974.

The two provinces were merged again after unification in 1976. In 1997 its former capital city of Da Nang was separated into its own administrative entity.

On 12 June 2025, as part of major nationwide reforms, Quảng Nam province was dissolved and merged with Da Nang city.

== Geography ==
Location

Quảng Nam comprises flat land along the coast and increasingly high elevations towards the west, with the highest elevations along the border to Laos and Kon Tum province. The highest peak is Ngọc Linh mountain at 2598m. In contrast to the other provinces of the South Central Coast there are no hills or mountains near the coast (with the exception of the Chàm Islands with a peak of 517m).

Quang Nam Province is located in the South Central Coast region of Central Vietnam, 820 km south of Hanoi, 235 km south of Hue City, bordering Da Nang City in the North and 900 km north of Ho Chi Minh City by National Highway 1A, with the following geographical location:

The northwest borders Hue city.

The northeast borders Da Nang city.

The southwest borders Kon Tum province.

The southeast borders Quang Ngai province.

The west borders Sekong province of Laos country.

The east borders the South China Sea.

The provincial capital of Quang Nam is located in Tam Ky City, with the ancient town of Hoi An. Quang Nam is located between Hanoi City and Ho Chi Minh City by National Highway 1A and Ho Chi Minh Road.

Quang Nam Province has an area of 10,574.86 km^{2} (4,082.98 sq mi), the 6th largest in Vietnam.

Terrain

The terrain gradually decreases from west to east and is divided into 3 regions: the western mountainous region, the midland in the middle and the eastern coastal plain. Quang Nam is located in the tropical monsoon climate zone, the average annual temperature is above 25 °C, the average annual rainfall is 2,000-2,500mm with more than 70% concentrated in the 3 rainy months (October, November and December). Vu Gia - Thu Bon and Tam Ky are the two main river basins in Quang Nam.

In general, the natural conditions of Quang Nam (weather-climate, terrain, water resources, sea) have many advantages and potentials for the development of diverse and unique cultural careers (developing cultural sub-regions), developing tourism (cultural tourism, eco-tourism).

Quang Nam has a terrain direction that gradually slopes from west to east, forming 3 distinct ecological landscapes: the western high mountains, the midland in the middle and the coastal plain. The mountainous area accounts for 72% of the natural area with many peaks over 2,000m high such as Lum Heo mountain at 2,045m high, Tion mountain at 2,032m high, Gole - Lang mountain at 1,855m high (Phuoc Son district). Ngoc Linh mountain at 2,598m high lies between the border of Quang Nam and Kon Tum, the highest peak of the Truong Son range. In addition, the coastal area east of the Truong Giang river is a long stretch of sand dunes running from Dien Ngoc, Dien Ban to Tam Quang, Nui Thanh. The terrain surface is divided by a fairly developed river system including the Thu Bon river, Tam Ky river and Truong Giang river. Quang Nam has a 125 km long coastline, with many beautiful and famous beaches such as: Ha My (Dien Ban), Cua Dai (Hoi An), Binh Minh (Thang Binh), Tam Thanh (Tam Ky), Bai Rang (Nui Thanh),... Cu Lao Cham is a cluster of coastal islands with a rich ecosystem recognized as a world biosphere reserve.

Climate

Quang Nam is located in a tropical climate zone, with only two seasons: rainy season and dry season, influenced by the cold winter of the North. The average annual temperature is 25.6 °C. In winter, the temperature in the plains can drop below 12 °C and the temperature in the mountains is even lower. The average humidity in the air is 84%. The average rainfall is 2000-2500mm. The rainy season usually lasts from October to December, the dry season lasts from February to August, January and September are transitional months characterized by turbulent weather and a lot of rain. Rain is unevenly distributed in space, with more rain in the mountains than in the plains. The Northwest region in the Bung River basin (Dong Giang, Tay Giang and Nam Giang districts) has the lowest rainfall, while the Southwest mountainous region in the Thu Bon River basin (Nam Tra My, Bac Tra My, Tien Phuoc and Hiep Duc districts) has the highest rainfall. Tra My is one of the largest rainfall centers in Vietnam with an average annual rainfall exceeding 4,000 mm. Heavy rains are concentrated in a short period of time during the 3-month rainy season on a narrow, steep terrain, creating favorable conditions for rapid river flooding.

There are currently two meteorological stations in the province that have monitored all meteorological factors for a long time (starting from 1976), namely Tam Ky station and Tra My station. Tam Ky station located in Hoa Thuan ward, Tam Ky city is used to calculate relevant meteorological factors for the eastern plain of the province. Tra My station located in Tra My town, Bac Tra My district is used to calculate relevant meteorological factors for the western mountainous region of the province.

Hydrology

Quang Nam has two large river systems: Vu Gia - Thu Bon (VG-TB) and Tam Ky. The VG-TB basin area (including a part of the basin in Kon Tum, Quang Ngai, Da Nang city) is 10,350 km², one of the 10 river systems with the largest basin area in Vietnam and the Tam Ky river basin is 735 km². The rivers originate from the eastern slope of the Truong Son range, flowing mainly in the West-East direction and emptying into the East Sea at the Han estuary (Da Nang), Dai estuary (Hoi An) and An Hoa (Nui Thanh). In addition to the two river systems above, the Truong Giang river is 47 km long, flowing along the coast in the North-South direction connecting the VG-TB and Tam Ky river systems.

Due to the steep terrain and heavy rainfall, the river network of Quang Nam province is quite dense. The average river density is 0.47 km/km² for the VG-TB system and 0.6 km/km² for other river systems.

The rivers have large flow rates, full of water all year round. Flow rates The average annual flow of the Vu Gia River (up to Thanh My town with a basin area of 1,850 km²) is 127 m³/s, and of the Thu Bon River (up to Nong Son with a basin area of 3,130 km²) is 281 m³/s. The flow regime of rivers has clear seasonal differences. The flow in the 3 months of the flood season (October, November, December) accounts for 65 - 70% of the total annual flow while the flow in the dry season (from February to August) is very low. January and September are transitional months with erratic flow. The maximum flow of the Thu Bon River at Nong Son is 10,600 m³/s and the minimum measured flow is 15.7 m³/s while the maximum flow of the Vu Gia River at Thanh My is 4,540 m³/s and the minimum is 10.5 m³/s. High flow in the rainy season and low flow in the dry season are the main causes of floods and droughts in the region.

Abundant water resources are the premise for hydropower development in the area. As of 2015, Quang Nam has 8 large-capacity hydropower projects (over 100 MW) and 35 small-capacity hydropower plants. Many large-capacity hydropower plants such as Song Tranh 2, Dak Mi 4, A Vuong, Song Bung 2, Song Bung 4, Song Kon 2... have been and are being built, contributing to the increasing electricity supply demand of the whole country.

Land

According to statistics and land inventory on January 1, 2010, in the total natural area of 1,043,836 ha, agricultural land accounts for 798,790 ha, non-agricultural land is 87,765 ha and unused land is 157,281 ha.

The total natural area of Quang Nam is 1,043,803 ha, formed from nine different types of soil including sand dunes and coastal sandy soil, river alluvial soil, marine alluvial soil, gray-fertile soil, red-yellow soil, valley soil, eroded and barren soil, etc. The riverside alluvial soil group is the most important soil group in the development of food crops, foodstuffs and short-term industrial crops. The red-yellow soil group in mountainous areas is favorable for planting forests, industrial crops and long-term fruit trees. The coastal sandy soil group is being exploited for aquaculture purposes.

Forest

Quang Nam province has 425,921 hectares of forest, with a coverage rate of 40.9%; the province's timber reserves are about 30 million m3. The area of natural forest is 388,803 ha, and planted forest is 37,118 ha. Rich forests in Quang Nam currently have about 10 thousand hectares, distributed on high mountain peaks, the remaining forest area is mainly poor forest, medium forest and regenerating forest, with timber reserves of about 69 m3/ha. Nature reserves in the province are located on the Thanh River in Nam Giang district.

In April 2011, Quang Nam provincial authorities established the Saola Nature Reserve, opening a corridor for mountain creatures between Laos and Vietnam, especially the endangered saola.

Evergreen broadleaf tropical forests are the dominant ecosystem in Quang Nam. Quang Nam is a province with rich forest potential, but due to overexploitation over a long period of time, the area of primary forest is still small. The promotion of forestation in recent years has increased the forest area of Quang Nam to more than 55% in 2014. This is one of the localities with the highest forest area in the country. Thanh River Special-Use Forest is the largest conservation area in the province, where wildlife in the Central Truong Son region is being preserved. Ngoc Linh ginseng is a precious medicinal plant distributed mainly at an altitude of over 2,000 m on Ngoc Linh mountain.

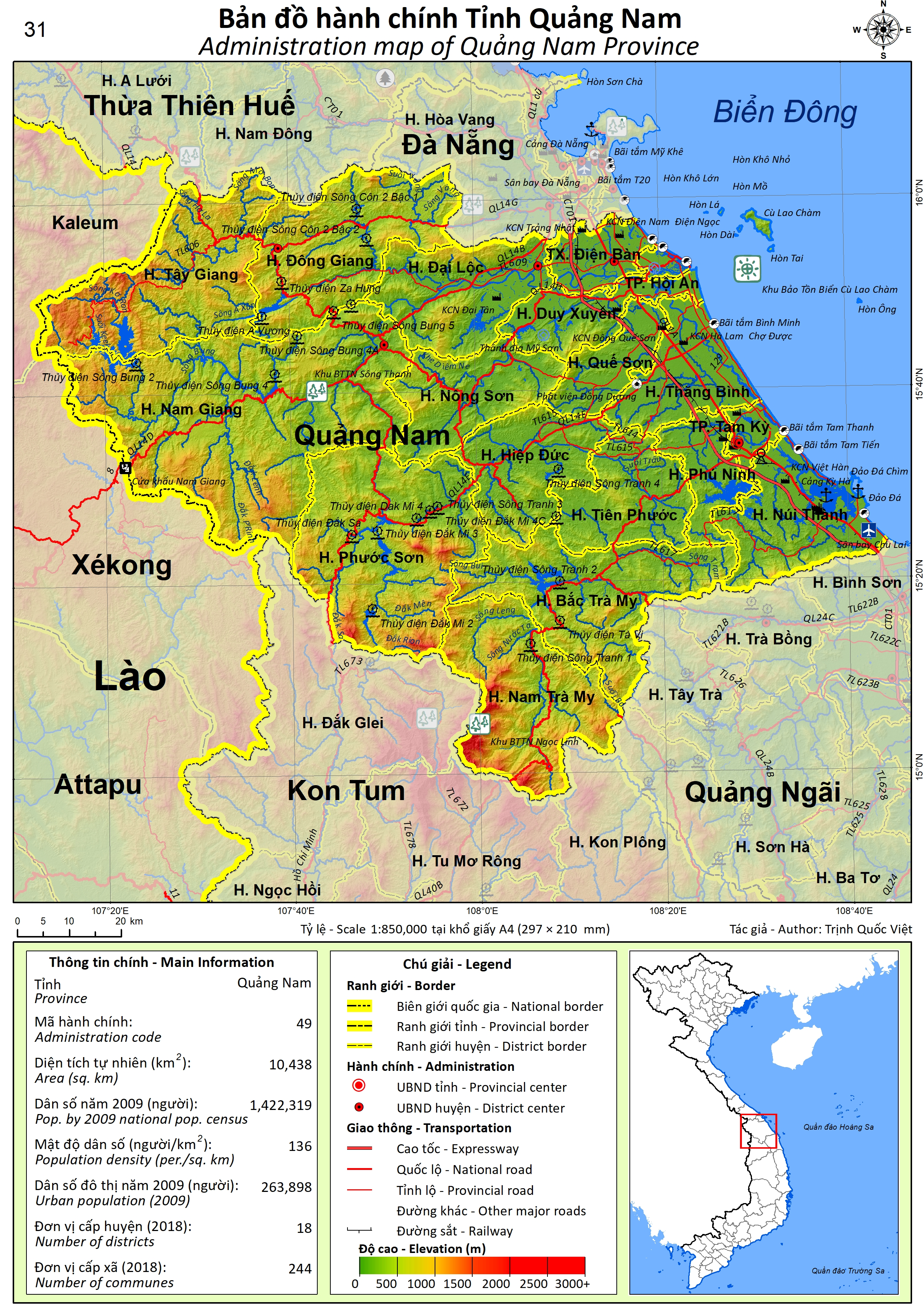
Administration map of Quangnam province

== Administrative divisions ==
Quảng Nam subdivided into 17 district-level sub-divisions:

Thirteen districts:

- Bắc Trà My
- Duy Xuyên
- Đại Lộc
- Đông Giang
- Hiệp Đức
- Nam Giang
- Nam Trà My
- Núi Thành
- Phú Ninh
- Phước Sơn
- Quế Sơn
- Tây Giang
- Thăng Bình
- Tiên Phước
- One district-level town:
  - Điện Bàn (created 2015)
- Two provincial cities:
  - Hội An (a UNESCO World Heritage Site)
  - Tam Kỳ (capital)

== Education ==
Quang Nam is a province with a relatively large scale of schools, classes, and students compared to other provinces and cities in the country. The network of schools and classes has all levels, grades, and majors, from preschool education, general education, continuing education to vocational high school, college, and university; all types of public and private education, basically meeting the learning needs of all classes of people in the province.

General education in the province is evenly distributed throughout the areas; in which each district, town, and city has 2-5 high schools. Schools are increasingly invested in and are more spacious; the staff and teachers are basically guaranteed in quantity and quality.

In recent years, Quang Nam students participating in national exams have always achieved high rankings. College and university education has also developed strongly in recent times. When the province was re-established in 1997, Quang Nam did not have a university, but now it has 2 universities and 1 academy, including: Quang Nam University, Phan Chau Trinh University and Academy of Public Administration and Governance campus in Quang Nam province.

== Economy ==
Quảng Nam has two traditional products: the world's highest essential oil content Trà My cinnamon (aka Saigon Cinnamon) and Ngọc Linh ginseng. Quảng Nam is known for its production of Saigon cinnamon.

The economy of Quảng Nam has been growing rapidly in recent years. GDP growth in 2010 was 12.7% and the goal for 2011 is 13.5%. Growth has been between 12 and 15% in the years from 2005 to 2007, mostly driven by a booming industrial sector (growing more than 20% per year) and to a lesser extent the service sector. GDP per capita in 2007 was 8.76 million Vietnamese đồng, 65.2% of the national average.

Quảng Nam's economy has been diversified significantly during the first decade of the 21st century. Agriculture, forestry, and fishery made up 41.5% of the province's GDP in 2000 but only 21.4% in 2010. This is only a relative decline. Growth of the first sector has been positive but overshadowed by industrial and service growth. It was between 2 and 4% between 2000 and 2007 and 4.5% in 2010. The vast majority of the work force is still employed in this sector: 524,700 out of 778,300 as of 2007 (down from 548,700 in 2000). Harvests of rice, which takes up 75% of the agricultural area, has increased from 329,900 tons in 2000 to 395,100 tons in 2007 (1.1% of the national rice output). The cultivation of industrial crops has experienced a significant transformation. The production of some crops has declined significantly: sugar cane from 170,400t in 2000 to 46,500t in 2007, tobacco from 2200t to 900t, tea from 1935t to 821t, and coconut from 8741t to 3675t, while the output of other crops has been increased: peanuts from 10,700t to 16,900t, rubber from 0t to 186t, pepper from 22t to 205t, and cashew nuts from 362t to 2345t. Given the recent significant expansion of rubber plantations, this crop is likely to grow further. So far, only peanut cultivation is significant in a national context, making up 3.35% of national output, while the other non-cereal crops contribute less than 1%.

Industrial GDP has been the main driving force of Quảng Nam's economy in the first decade of the century. In 2010 it contributed 40.1% to the provincial GDP, up from just 25.3% in 2000 and employed 99,600 workers in 2007, compared to 51,600 in 2000. Industrial GDP has increased 2.48 times between 2000 and 2007 and continues to grow at around 20%. Chu Lai Economic Zone is located in the south of the province along National Road 1 and is the site of many of the province's factories. A smaller industrial zone is located in Tam Kỳ with factories producing electrical equipment, garments, and processed wood. Major industrial export products include leather shoes (US$51.26 million in 2007), garments (US$31.33 million), wooden products (US$8.587 million), and paper materials (US$2.136 million). Industrial products more oriented towards the domestic market include fish sauce (3.69 million liters), bricks (253 million pieces), fabric (52.5 million meters), and hand farming tools (2 million pieces).

Quang Nam has the biggest gas warehouse in the central area: Total Gas & Power Co. Ltd's Ky Ha gas warehouse.

== Transportation ==
Quang Nam has a fairly developed transportation system with many types such as roads, railways, waterways, airways and sea routes. National Highway 1A passes through it.

=== Highways ===
- The national and provincial highway systems in the province are built in the north-south and east-west directions. National Highway 1A and the North-South Expressway in the east pass through the districts, towns and cities of Nui Thanh, Tam Ky, Phu Ninh, Thang Binh, Que Son, Duy Xuyen and Dien Ban. National Highway 14 passes through the districts of Phuoc Son, Nam Giang, Dong Giang and Tay Giang. National Highway 14B passes through the districts of Dai Loc and Nam Giang. National Highway 14E passes through the districts of Thang Binh, Hiep Duc and Phuoc Son. In addition, the province also has a road system including provincial roads such as 604, 605, 607, 609, 610, 611, 614, 615, 616, 617, 618 (new and old), 620 and many rural roads, commune roads, and others.
- National Highway 1A, National Highway 1 or CT01: Starting point at km 942 is the border between Da Nang city and Quang Nam province. The ending point at km 1027 is the border between Quang Nam and Quang Ngai provinces.
- Da Nang–Quang Nam–Quang Ngai Expressway belongs to a section of the North–South Expressway in the east: Starting point at the border between Da Nang and Quang Nam. The ending point is at the border between Quang Nam and Quang Ngai.
- Ho Chi Minh Road: Starting point at A Tep, the border between Thua Thien Hue province and Quang Nam province, Ending point at Dac Zon bridge, the border between Quang Nam province and Kon Tum province.
- National Highway 14B: The starting point is at km 32, the border between Da Nang city and Quang Nam province, in the territory of Hoa Vang district and Dai Loc district. The end point is at km 74, the intersection with Ho Chi Minh road in Nam Giang district.
- National Highway 14D: The starting point is at km 0 in Ben Giang, connecting with Ho Chi Minh road, the end point is at km 74.4 at Dac Oc border gate (Nam Giang district), the border between Quang Nam province - Vietnam and Xe Kong province - Laos.
- National Highway 14E: The starting point is at km 0 at Cay Coc intersection (Thang Binh district) intersecting with National Highway 1 (972 + 200 km). The end point is at km 78 + 432, intersecting with Ho Chi Minh road in Kham Duc town (Phuoc Son district).
- National Highway 14G: The starting point is at Prao town, Dong Giang, the end point is in Quang Nam province, on the border with Da Nang city.
- National Highway 14H: Starting point at Cua Dai port (Hoi An city), ending point at Truong Son Dong road in Que Lam commune, Nong Son district.
- National Highway 40B.
- National Highway 24C.

=== Railways ===
The Vietnam railway axis passes through this province:

- Nong Son station in Dien Phuoc commune, Dien Ban town, Quang Nam province.
- Tra Kieu station in Duy Son commune, Duy Xuyen district, Quang Nam province.
- Phu Cang station in Binh Quy commune, Thang Binh district, Quang Nam province.
- An My station in Tam An commune, Phu Ninh district, Quang Nam province.
- Tam Ky station in An Xuan ward, Tam Ky city, Quang Nam province.
- Diem Pho station in Tam Anh commune, Nui Thanh district, Quang Nam province.
- Nui Thanh station in Nui Thanh town, Nui Thanh district, Quang Nam province.

=== Airports ===
In 1965, the Americans built Chu Lai airport, aiming to serve military activities in the Central and Central Highlands regions. 40 years later, on March 2, 2005, Chu Lai airport welcomed the first commercial flight from Ho Chi Minh City, marking a historic event for the province. In 2010, Vietnam Airlines had a Chu Lai–Hanoi route. The commercial operation of Chu Lai airport will strongly promote the development of not only Quang Nam (with Chu Lai industrial park) but also Quang Ngai province (with Dung Quat industrial park). Furthermore, Chu Lai airport will be developed into an international airport serving the transit of passengers and goods in the region. In addition, the operation of Chu Lai airport will make it easier for tourists to visit two world cultural heritages, Hoi An Ancient Town and My Son Sanctuary. Chu Lai Airport is currently the second largest airport in the country (about 3,200 hectares) after Long Thanh Airport (about 5,000 hectares). Chu Lai Airport is about 8 meters above sea level and has a runway of about 3,055 meters long, paved with concrete. The goal is to turn Chu Lai Airport into an international airport by 2030 and become the largest cargo transit and transportation center in the country with an expected capacity of one million tons of cargo/year.

Current address of Chu Lai Airport: Tam Nghia commune, Nui Thanh district, Quang Nam province.

However, Da Nang International Airport is another alternative airport that the province also use which provides more domestic and international destinations. The airport which is approximately located 28 km north of Hội An.

=== Riverways ===
Quang Nam has 941 km of natural rivers, currently managing and exploiting 307 km of rivers (accounting for 32.62%), including 11 main rivers. The main operating river systems include 2 systems: Thu Bon River and Truong Giang River, these two river systems both flow into the East Sea through 3 estuaries: Han River, Cua Dai River and Ky Ha River

Central Rivers managed by the Government: 132 km long, including: Section 1 of Thu Bon River, Truong Giang River.

The entire waterway currently exploited for water transport in Quang Nam province is 207 km long, including 11 routes: Thu Bon River, Truong Giang River, Vu Gia River, Yen River, Vinh Dien River, Co Co River, Hoi An River, Duy Vinh River, Ba Ren River, Tam Ky River and An Tan River.

== Places of interest ==
The province has two UNESCO World Heritage Sites: the ancient town of Hội An and the Mỹ Sơn temple complex. It also lies on the World Heritage Road which connects different World Heritage Sites in Central Vietnam.

Another popular tourist site is Cu Lao Cham (Cham Islands).

== Culture ==
Festival

- The Ba Thu Bon Festival is a folk festival of the residents along the Thu Bon River, Quang Nam Province, with the purpose of praying for a new year of harmony and prosperity for the people. The festival is held annually on the 12th day of the second lunar month.[26] Interspersed with folk performances are the cheers of the spectators on both banks. The most important rituals are the Ba worship ceremony and the water procession to the temple. The Ba Thu Bon Temple is located in a riverside plain in Duy Xuyen District. The most important part of the festival is the Le Ba boat racing festival (Male-Female), the flower lantern releasing festival and the sacred fire burning on the alluvial banks of the Thu Bon River. The Ba Chiem Son Festival is a festival of the residents who raise silkworms and weave silk in Duy Trinh Commune, Duy Xuyen District. The festival is held on the 10th-12th day of the first lunar month at the Ba Chiem Son Palace. The festival is an opportunity to express respect to the person who gave birth to the silkworm breeding and weaving profession in the locality. Festival participants have the opportunity to enjoy typical dishes of Quang Nam people. The festival is also an opportunity to participate in folk games such as cockfighting, throwing balls into baskets, and singing Bai Choi.
- Hoi An Carnival is a street festival held for the first time in Hoi An city on New Year's Eve 2009 (solar calendar). The festival is modeled after the famous street Carnival festivals in European and Latin American countries
- The Ba Cho Duoc procession festival is held annually on January 11 (lunar calendar) in Binh Trieu commune, Thang Binh district. This is a type of spiritual festival to pay respect to Mrs. Nguyen Thi Cua. According to the document "Than Nu Linh Ung Truyen", she was born in 1799 in Dai Loc district, Quang Nam province. She died in 1817, at the age of 18. According to local residents, she is very sacred. During a trip to Phuoc Am village (now Cho Duoc, Binh Trieu commune, Thang Binh district, Quang Nam province), seeing the beautiful river scene, she chose this place to hold a market to help the residents have a more prosperous life. She transformed into a beautiful 18-year-old girl who sold water and betel leaves. Gradually, the surrounding residents gathered to trade, and Cho Duoc was formed and developed. To remember her merits, the residents in the area built a temple to worship her and the royal court conferred the title "Goddess Linh Ung - Nguyen Thi Dang Than".
- Nguyen Tieu Festival is a festival of the Chinese in Hoi An. The festival is held at Trieu Chau and Quang Trieu Assembly Halls on the 16th day of the first lunar month every year.
- The Old Quarter Full Moon Festival is held on the 14th day of the lunar month every month in the ancient town of Hoi An. At that time, the residents in the city will turn off all the lights, replacing them with the brilliant light from lanterns. The city lives in the quiet space of the past. Motor vehicles are not allowed to circulate. The streets are reserved for pedestrians to enjoy.

Traditional craft village

- Thanh Ha Pottery Village (Thanh Ha Ward, Hoi An City)
- Kim Bong Carpentry Village (Cam Kim Commune, Hoi An City)
- Phuoc Kieu Bronze Casting Village (Dien Phuong Ward, Dien Ban Town)
- Ma Chau Weaving Village (Nam Phuoc Town, Duy Xuyen District)
- Dong Yen - Thi Lai Mulberry Village (Duy Trinh Commune, Duy Xuyen District)
- Ban Thach Sedge Mat Weaving Village (Duy Vinh Commune, Duy Xuyen District)
- Tra Que Vegetable Village (Cam Ha Commune, Hoi An City)
- Lam Yen Drum Village (Dai Minh Commune, Dai Loc District)
- Noodle Making Village (Tan Thanh Ward, Tam Ky City)
- Cua Khe Traditional Fish Sauce Craft Village (Binh Duong Commune, Thang Binh District)
- Tam Thanh Mural Village (Tam Thanh Commune, Tam Ky City)
- Hoi An Silk Village (Hoi An City)
- Phu Ninh Fish Sauce Craft Village (Phu Ninh District)

== Cuisine ==
Quang Nam is a province with many local specialties and cuisines such as: seafood, Quang noodles, Hoi An cao lau, Cau Mong grilled veal, Tra My cinnamon, Hoi An rice cake, Nui Thanh flying fish, Nam Tra My Ngoc Linh ginseng, Nam cake, Quang Nam sugar bowl, Tien Phuoc bon bon salad, Hong Dao wine, Dai Loc rice paper, wild bamboo shoots, Northwest bamboo rice, shallots, water fern cake, Dong Giang a rieu chili, Tay Nguyen rice wine, Tam Ky chicken rice, Hoi An xi ma, Thuan cake, Dai Binh pomelo, wild vegetables, purple ba kich, sesame cake, Tra Que tam huu, Quang sweet potato, Deo Le bamboo chicken, Dong Giang ra den tea, Dien Ban sugar cane, Northwest insects, green banana salad, Nong Son lotus leaf and mussels, pork rolls, Tien Phuoc pepper, steamed buns - vac cakes, Tam Ky jackfruit, salty green bean cakes, cactus vegetables, Hoi An tea, Co Tu croissant cakes, mussel dishes, sugar-dipped rice paper, Thang Binh pickled onions, snails. Tien River rocks, peanut candy (cu do cake), Tay Giang oranges, Hoi An bread, Co Tu zơ ra, banh xeo, Tam Thanh fish sauce, wild honey, Phu Triem rice paper, sticky rice with sugar, Tien Phuoc moldy banana, Hoi An rice cake, mixed mountain bamboo shoots, Ngang beach squid, Dai Loc pineapple, Tay Giang tr'din wine, green eel porridge, tapioca cake, Western bee pupae, nien fish, Nam Tra My apples, Hoi An wonton, Dong Phu cassava pho, Ta vat wine, shrimp rolls, Loc Dai bitter sticky rice, Cua Khe fish sauce, green lim mushrooms, Cu Lao Cham bird's nest.

== Religion ==
As of April 1, 2019, the province had 11 different religions with 78,977 people, the most being Catholicism with 37,526 people, followed by Buddhism with 22,670 people, Protestantism with 11,730 people, Cao Dai with 6,970 people. The remaining religions include Baha'i with 36 people, Hoa Hao Buddhism with 17 people, Minh Su religion with 13 people, Brahmanism with seven people, Islam with five people, Minh Ly religion with two people and 1 person following Buu Son Ky Huong.

== Sport ==
Tam Ky Stadium is located in the central area of Tam Ky city, where sports and cultural - social activities of the province are organized and is also the home ground of QNK Quang Nam Football Club. This is the football team representing Quang Nam province in the Vietnam National Football Championship Vleague.
