= Phú Ninh Reservoir =

- Phú Ninh Lake
- Hồ Phú Ninh (Vietnamese)
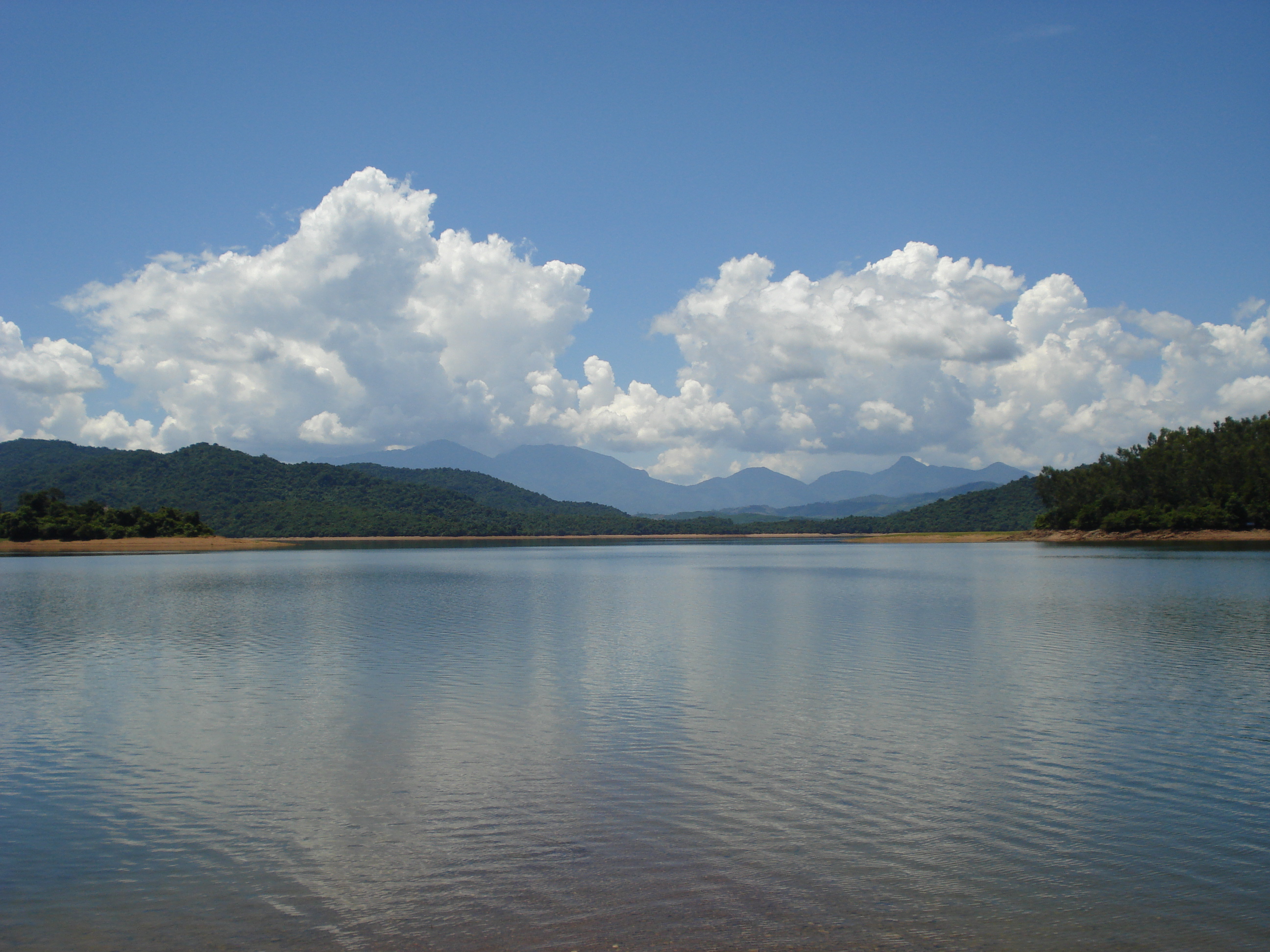

- Location within Vietnam
- Location: Phú Ninh District, Quảng Nam
- Coordinates: 15°29′07″N 108°27′26″E
- Lake type: Reservoir
- Basin countries: Vietnam
- Surface area: 3,433 ha (8,480 acres)
- Islands: 30
- Settlements: Tam Kỳ

Phú Ninh Reservoir (Vietnamese: Hồ Phú Ninh) is an artificial lake in Phú Ninh District, Quảng Nam Province, Vietnam. It was called as "The blue pearl of Quảng Nam".

== Location ==
Lake Phú Ninh is 7 km south from Tam Kỳ Town, 70 km from Da Nang City and about 15 km from Chu Lai International Airport, Quảng Nam Province. On its banks are villages belonging to Phú Ninh District and Núi Thành District.

== Resources ==
Phú Ninh Lake water is the main source of water for residential and agricultural use in Tam Kỳ Town and other places in Phú Ninh and Núi Thành districts. Lake Phú Ninh has hot mineral spring waters. Hydroelectric power from Lake Phú Ninh contributes up to 3 million kwh per year. Annually, about 80 tons of fish are taken from Phú Ninh Lake.

== Forest protection ==
The total protective area surrounding Phú Ninh Lake is 23,409 ha, belonging to Phú Ninh and Núi Thành District. According to the Quảng Nam Forestry Bureau (in 2000), the area included 15,768 ha of forest including 1,500 ha of plantation forest. There is a great variety of animal and plant life, which are recorded in Vietnam's Red Data Book. It is the place to conserve hundred of plants and precious herbs with various zoology and plantation management systems. Phú Ninh Lake was recently awarded national historical heritage status.

== Topography ==
The area is made up of low hills, average height 100–300 m, but some are 500–700 m above sea level. The average slope is 100 m, sloping to the west, south west and north east to form a small valley. To the south are mountain ranges with high peaks and sharp inclines which make this area strongly isolated. To the north and northwest are low mountains with easy slopes, creating many flat and large valleys surrounding Phú Ninh Lake.

The soil is mostly yellow-red feralite soil on sandstone (comprising app. 61.11% of the total) which is easily eroded and not conducive to growing vegetables and crops. Red yellow feralite soil on igneous rock (app. 20%) is often covered by forest. Fertile soil makes up the remaining 15-17% and exists in valleys along the springs where the residential areas and fields are concentrated.

== Climate ==
Phú Ninh Lake's climate belongs to the Middle South climate area. It is not cold in autumn. Daily and yearly temperatures are both relatively low for Vietnam. There are two seasons: rainy and dry. The average readings taken at the Tam Kỳ weather station show the following characteristics:

- Temperature
  - Yearly average temperature: 25.6 °C
  - Average temperature high: 29.7 °C
  - Monthly lowest average temperature: 22.7 °C
  - Monthly average temperature fluctuation: 7 °C
  - Monthly average approximate humidity 82%. From September to October, approximate humidity is 82%-88%. From April to September, monthly average approximate humidity is about 75%-81%
- Precipitation
  - Rainfall is concentrated from September to December
  - Yearly average rainfall: 2,491mm
  - Highest rainfall: 3,307 mm
  - Lowest rainfall: 1.111 mm
  - Daily lowest rainfall: 332 mm
- Wind
  - Phú Ninh Lake has two main wind directions: East and Northeast. The east wind prevails from March to August. The northeast wind prevails from October to November
  - Average wind speed: 2.9 m/s; highest wind speed: 40 m/s (in stormy weather).
  - Strong wind speed is from 14 m/s to 28 m/s
  - Storms occur from September to October. There are 0-5 direct storms yearly and 2-3 indirect storms and tropical pressure systems.
  - Hot and dry West wind: Southwest wind happens in May. From May to August, there are 10 to 15 hot and dry days.

== Terrain/Ecosystems ==
- Regenerated forest and mountains.
- Low mountain.
- Lakes and small islands.
- Field, milpas and residential areas.

== Zoology and plant resources ==
- Forest cover:
  - Plants on mountain includes thin forest (about 860 ha, cover to the south) and extremely thin forest (about 530 ha)
  - Bush, grass: total area is about 10,000 ha, covering everywhere. The soil is dry, low regenerated capability
  - Plantation: about 700 ha, mainly concentrate on the north boundary of the lake which is mostly eucalyptus.
    - The forest surrounding the lake has been negatively impacted by the lingering effects of the war and continued exploitation.
- Plants:
  - Phu Ninh forest has approximately 369 species of plants, 10 of which are recorded in Vietnam's Red Data Book.
- Plant resources:
  - There are 250 useful plants, which include 211 plants with medicinal uses, 85 types of wood, 66 used for ornamental and shading purposes, 50 types of fruits and crops, 14 used for handicraft materials and 22 that produce rubber or various oils. (Some plants have more than one use.)
- Animals:
  - Land vertebrates with 148 species representing 69 families, 27 groups and 4 classes
  - Aquatic animals:
    - Floating animals: 13 species.
    - Fish: 14 species.
    - Seabed animals: 11 species (clams, snails)
- Land invertebrates:
  - Insects: 150 species, representing 11 groups which are tremendous and various. Some are colorful, attracting tourists.
- Protected species
  - According to the research by the Ministry of Agriculture and Rural Development (in 2003), the Phú Ninh area has many endangered species such as:
    - 11 kinds of mammals recorded in the Red Data Book need to be protected. Notably, these include the red monkey, yellow monkey and the long tail monkey. The last known Javan rhinoceros was killed in 2010.
    - 7 reptiles, including: python, cobra, egretta garzetta.

== Current land use ==
- North Lake area:
  - Dams: Chinh dam, Tu Yen dam, Long Son dam, and Duong Lam dam
  - Management office, Security office: lake management team, forest protect station
  - Power station
  - Chap Tra mountain is a small natural mountain in the North of the lake with some endangered animals. It is available for sightseeing.
  - Agriculture land, fish pond and agricultural channel
  - Mineral water and security station
- Island and peninsula:
  - Phú Ninh Lake has 15 small and big islands. The small islands often flood in rainy season. The North and East islands no longer have any natural forest. The new plantation area includes pine, eucalyptus. There is very little fauna.
  - Rua Island: natural forest, small animals, especially two small kinds of monkey.
  - So Island: the biggest island of Phú Ninh Lake. The natural forest is being recovered. There are many animals, birds, reptiles. The quantity is low but with potential for growth.
  - 61st Island: This is the location of the old two-story structure that houses the lake management team. Because most of the forest on this island is planted, the landscape and the zoology system are poor and need to be improved.
  - The South and West Islands and peninsulas (belonging to Tam Son and Tam Lanh communes): many wild animals are present such as deer, reptiles, birds.

== Mineral water ==
At the heart of the lake, near Chap Tra valley, there are many mineral water resources with useful elements for digestion and health improvement. The temperature of Phú Ninh's mineral water is 900C underground, 600C-700C when flowing out; the flowing speed is 0.5 L/s. The mineral water company in Tam Ky commune uses it to make various products (planned output: 15 million bottles/year) However, they have not used this mineral water for medicinal purposes yet.
