= Thiền Quang Lake =

Lake in Vietnam

- Hồ Thiền Quang (Vietnamese)
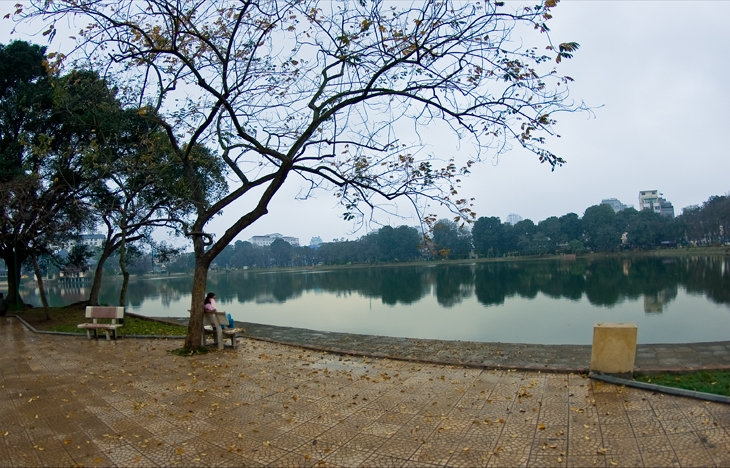

- Location within Vietnam
- Location: Hanoi
- Coordinates: 21.018429°N 105.845543°E
- Basin countries: Vietnam

Thiền Quang Lake (Vietnamese: Hồ Thiền Quang) is a lake in Hanoi, Vietnam. It was previously known as the Lac Halais during the French colonial period (1888–1945) due to its location next to the rue Halais, now Nguyễn Du Street.
