= Chàm Islands =

Islands in Vietnam

Cham Islands
Native name: cù lao Chàm
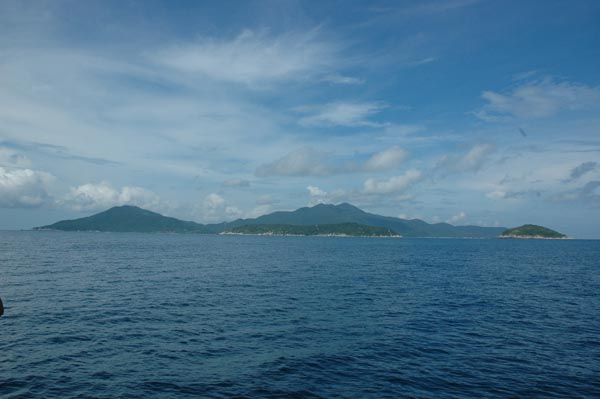
- A panoramic view of the Chàm Islands

- Location within Vietnam

Geography
- Location: South China Sea
- Coordinates: 15°57′14.8″N 108°31′20.6″E
- Area: 15 km^{2} (5.8 sq mi)
- Highest elevation: 517 m (1696 ft)

Administration
- Vietnam
- Municipality: Danang
- Commune: Tân Hiệp

Demographics
- Population: 3,000

Additional information
- Time zone: UTC+7 (UTC+7)
  - Summer (DST): No DST (UTC+7)

The Chàm Islands (Vietnamese: cù lao Chàm) constitute a group of 8 small islands of the municipality of Da Nang, which form a part of the Cu Lao Cham Marine Park, a world Biosphere Reserve recognized by UNESCO, in the South China Sea in Vietnam. The islands can be reached from Cửa Đại beach. The islands are also recognized as a national scenic site of Vietnam.

The islands in the group are: Hòn Lao (Pearl Island), Hòn Dài (Long Island), Hòn Mồ (Tomb Island), Hòn Khô mẹ (Mother Dry Island), Hòn Khô con (Child Dry Island), Hòn Lá (Leaf Island), Hòn Tai (Ear Island) and Hòn Ông (East Wind Island). The Chàm Islands are under the administration of Tân Hiệp commune of the municipality of Da Nang.

The occupation of the people of the islands is mainly fishing.

The ancient landscape of the Chàm Islands offers many sandy beaches, forested hills and sea. Facilities for camping, swimming and scuba diving are available. The corals and other marine life are an attraction in the waters of these island.

== Geography ==
The Chàm island group is a lower extension in SE of the granite block named Bạch Mã–Hải Vân–Sơn Trà, belonging to the Hải Vân complex of early Triassic age, mainly composed of biotite granite and two-mica granites.

The agglomeration of the one large island surrounded by seven small islands cover a sea area of 15 square kilometres (5.8 mi^{2}); located in South China Sea, 16 kilometres (9.9 mi) from the coast and 19 kilometres (12 mi) to the east of Hội An ancient town.

Hòn Lao, the largest island, circular in shape, has an area of 1,317 hectares (3,250 acres) with an average altitude of 500 metres (1,600 ft). The is a 517 metres (1,696 ft)-high peak in the centre of the island and another peak 326 metres (1,070 ft) high at the western end. There are two fishing villages on this largest island: Bãi Làng, with docking piers, and the smaller Bãi Hương. Bãi Chồng Beach is the most notable beach on the island. The islands act as a defensive wall for Hội An ancient town.

Seafarers were attracted to these ancient islands for favourable anchorage facilities off Bãi Làng village on Hòn Lao island, where a freshwater supply could also be found. This is corroborated by early Chinese charts from 700 AD.

The islands are accessible by a three-hour canoe journey, or by speed boats in about half an hour from the nearest mainland point.

== History ==
Archaeologists claim that the Chàm Islands were first settled by Cham people about 3,000 years ago. However, business contacts were established with other countries about 1,000 years ago. The Chams used the Chàm islands for transhipment to the mainland. Many architectural monuments dated to the 18th and 20th century are reported, which include the Thần Yến Sào shrine built in 1843 at Bãi Hương, and the Hải Tạng pagoda built in 1753 on the western hillside of Hòn Lao. Small monuments, dikes, and basins to grow rice on terraces are also seen in the interior forest areas.

== Resources ==
The rich aquatic resources of the islands consist of 165 hectares (410 acres) of corals and 500 hectares (1,200 acres) of seaweeds. 135 species of coral, four species of tiger shrimp and 84 species of mollusc are found in the waters surrounding the islands; some of these species are listed in the Vietnam's and the World's Red Book of Endangered Species. Medicinal plants have also been inventoried on the islands.

The traditional resources of the Cham people of the islands comprise rice farming, fishing, and trading with neighbouring countries through the port of Hội An in pepper, cinnamon bark, ivory and wood.

The islands are known for the Salanganes swallows whose nests have been a source of revenue to the local people. The expensive Chinese dish of bird's nest soup is made out of these nests. Swallow nest harvesting has therefore become an important industry in the islands, which also provides revenue to the state. The annual swallow harvest is reported at about 1.4 tons, valued at US$4,000 per kilogram.

== Gallery ==
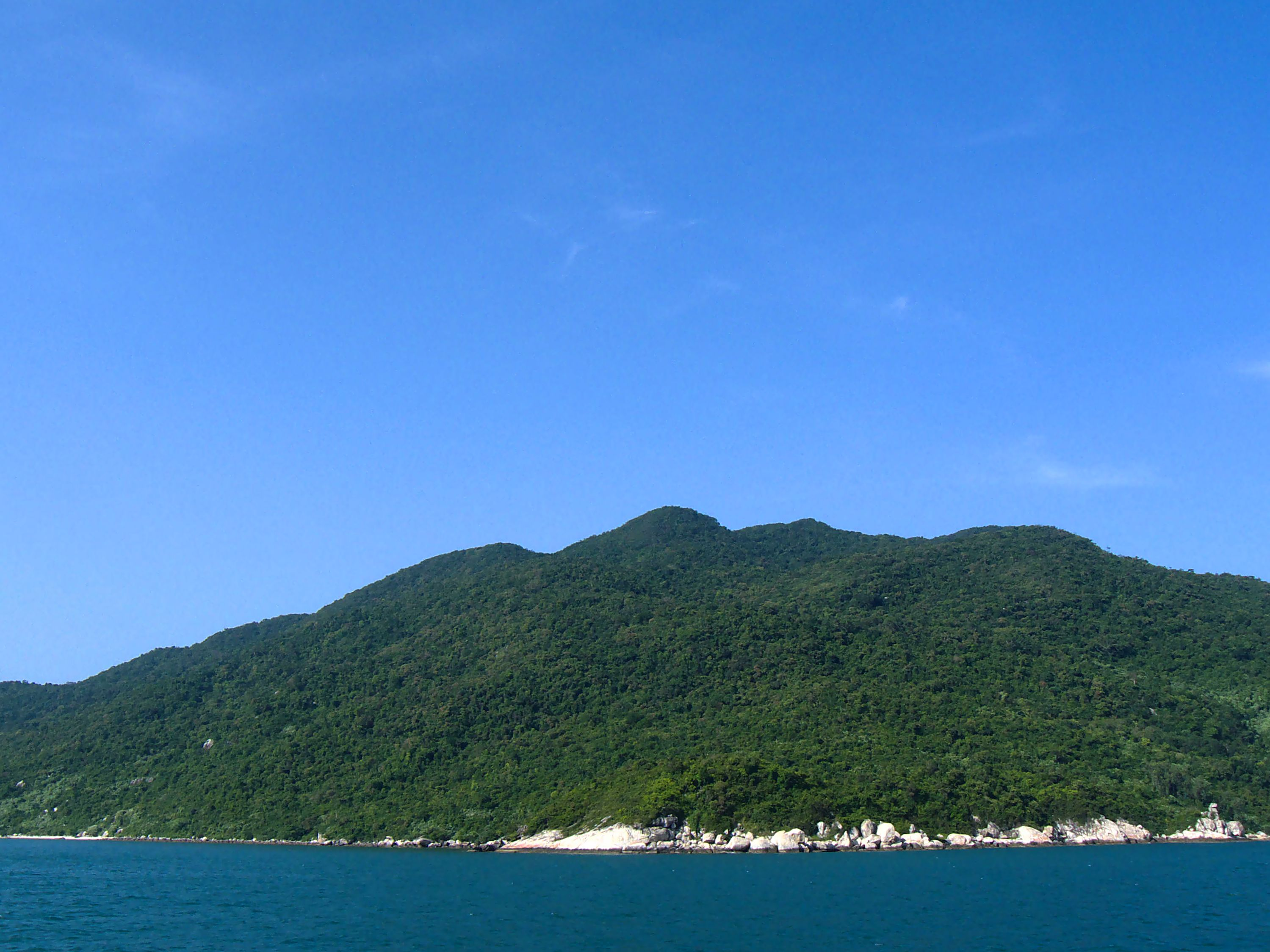
The Main Island – Cu Lao Cham Marine Park

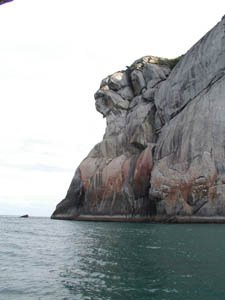
Rocky hill of the Main Island

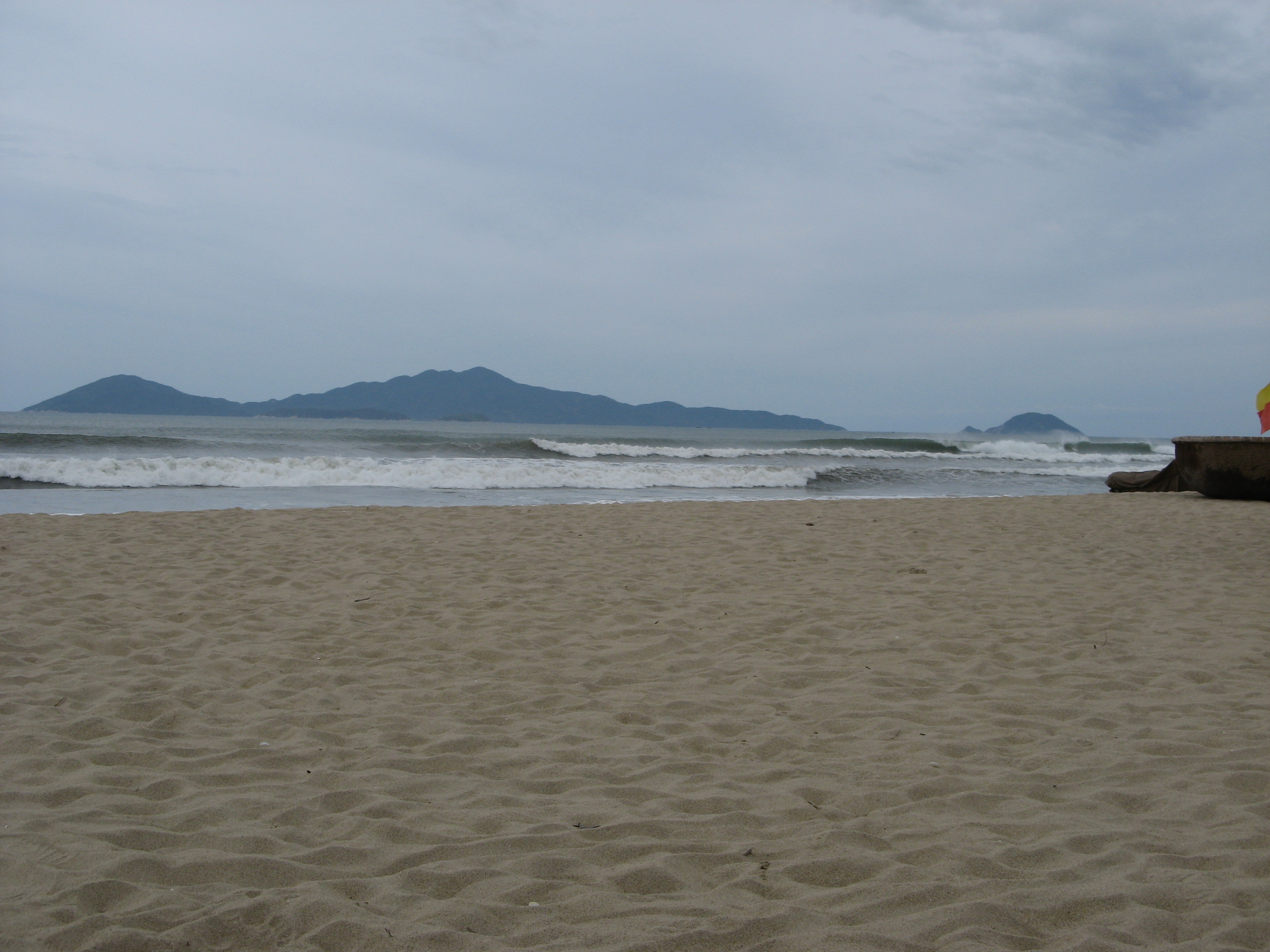
Beach on the main land

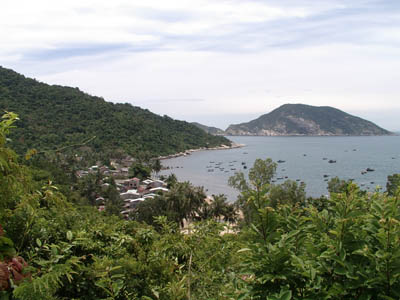
Village on the islands
