= Ayun Hạ Reservoir =

- Ayun Hạ Lake
- Hồ Ayun Hạ (Vietnamese)
- Location within Vietnam
- Location: Gia Lai Province, Vietnam
- Coordinates: 13°35′N 108°16′E
- Type: Reservoir
- River sources: Ayun River
- Built: 1994
- Max. length: 25 km (16 mi)
- Max. width: 5 km (3.1 mi)
- Surface area: 37 km^{2} (14 sq mi)

Ayun Hạ Reservoir or Ayun Hạ Lake (Vietnamese: Hồ Ayun Hạ) is an artificial lake in Gia Lai Province, Vietnam. The lake was formed when the Ayun River was stopped early in 1994, to start the construction of a dam and lake for irrigation. The flooded area of the lake district belongs to the commune of HBong Chu Se.

The lake has a surface area of 37 km^{2} (14 sq mi), and has a length of 25 km (16 mi), and is 5 km (3.1 mi) at its widest.
