= Phú Ninh district =

Coordinates: 15°34′N 108°24′E

Phú Ninh District Huyện Phú Ninh
- District
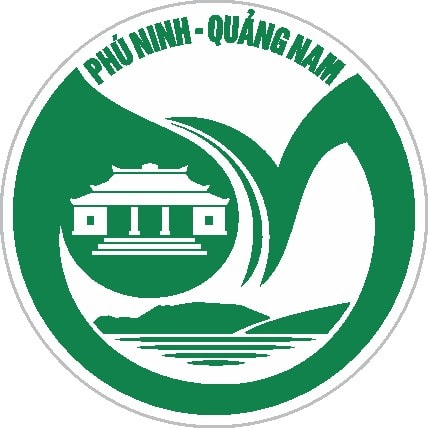
- Seal
- Interactive map of Phú Ninh District
- Country: Vietnam
- Region: South Central Coast
- Province: Quảng Nam
- Capital: Phú Thịnh

Area
  - Total: 64 sq mi (167 km^{2})

Population (2003)
  - Total: 114,048
- Time zone: UTC+7 (UTC + 7)

Phú Ninh is a district (huyện) of Quảng Nam province in the South Central Coast region of Vietnam. As of 2003 the district had a population of 114,048. The district covers an area of 167 km^{2} (64 sq mi). The district capital lies at Phú Thịnh.

Between 2005 and 2016, the Bông Miêu gold mine operated in the district. The mine was one of the largest gold mines in Southeast Asia. Following its 2018 bankruptcy, the mine's Canadian parent company Besra Gold corporation left Vietnam, leaving behind millions of USD in debt and environmental damages mitigation cost. After the mine was closed, illegal miners caused further pollution in the area.
