= Giang =

Giang or Giàng may refer to

== Communes and villages in Vietnam ==
- Cẩm Giàng, Bắc Kạn
- Đức Giang
- Hồng Giang (disambiguation)
- Long Giang
- Phình Giàng
- Tam Giang (disambiguation)
- Tam Giang Đông
- Tam Giang Tây
- Trường Giang (disambiguation)

== Other places in Vietnam ==
- An Giang province
  - An Giang Airport
  - An Giang University
  - An Giang FC, a football club
- Bắc Giang province
  - Bắc Giang, the province capital
  - Bắc Giang station
  - Bắc Giang River
- Bình Giang district
- Cẩm Giàng district
- Châu Giang, a former district
- Đông Giang district
- Giang Thành district
- Hà Giang province
  - Hà Giang, the province capital
  - List of fauna of Hà Giang
- Hậu Giang province
- Kiên Giang province
  - Kiến Giang, the province capital
  - Kiến Giang River
  - Kiên Giang FC, a football club
- Lạng Giang district
- Nam Giang district
- Ninh Giang district
- Tây Giang district
- Tiền Giang province
  - Tien Giang FC, a football club
- Văn Giang district

== Other ==
- Giang (name)
- An Giang Coffee, a coffee company in Vietnam
- Battle of Lo Giang during the Vietnam War in February 1968

== See also ==
- Gyang, a given name and surname
