= Miridiba enigmatica =

Scientific classification
- Kingdom: Animalia
- Phylum: Arthropoda
- Clade: Pancrustacea
- Class: Insecta
- Order: Coleoptera
- Suborder: Polyphaga
- Infraorder: Scarabaeiformia
- Family: Scarabaeidae
- Genus: Miridiba
- Species: M. enigmatica

Binomial name
- Miridiba enigmatica Keith, 2020

Species of beetle

Miridiba enigmatica is a species of beetle of the family Scarabaeidae. It is endemic to Vietnam, where it has only been recorded from the Tây Giang district in Quảng Nam province. It is a stout beetle that grows to a length of 18 mm (0.7 in). The body has a shiny, smooth, hairless dorsum. The scutellum, elytra, sternites, and femora are pale reddish-brown, while the head, pronotum, and legs are dark brown, giving the species a two-coloured appearance.

== Taxonomy ==
Miridiba enigmatica was formally described in 2020 by the French entomologist Denis Keith on the basis of a male specimen collected from Axan in Tây Giang district, Vietnam. The species is named after its unique aedeagus, which is more similar to that of some Pentelia species.

== Description ==
Miridiba enigmatica is a stout beetle that grows to a length of 18 mm (0.7 in). Males have shiny, smooth dorsums with no hairs. The scutellum, elytra, sternites, and femora are pale reddish-brown, while the head, pronotum, and legs are dark brown. The combination of these features makes the species seem two-coloured. Like other members of its genus, M. enigmatica has 10-segmented antennae, 3-segmented antennal clubs, parameres made of many apophyses, accessory denticles on the claws, a clypeus that is shorter than the frons, extensive punctures on the pronotum, and a hairy mentum with a notch towards its front edge.

M. enigmatica is quite similar in appearance to M. sinensis, M. pseudosinensis, M. axanensis, and M. quasisinensis. Compared to those species, M. enigmatica can be distinguished by the shape of its aedeagus.

== Distribution ==
Miridiba enigmatica is an endemic of Vietnam, where it has been collected only from Tây Giang district in Quảng Nam province, at an altitude of 1,300 m (4,300 ft).
