= Miridiba axanensis =

Scientific classification
- Kingdom: Animalia
- Phylum: Arthropoda
- Clade: Pancrustacea
- Class: Insecta
- Order: Coleoptera
- Suborder: Polyphaga
- Infraorder: Scarabaeiformia
- Family: Scarabaeidae
- Genus: Miridiba
- Species: M. axanensis

Binomial name
- Miridiba axanensis Keith, 2020

Species of beetle

Miridiba axanensis is a species of beetle of the family Scarabaeidae. It is endemic to Vietnam, where it has only been recorded from the Tây Giang district in Quảng Nam province. It is a stout beetle that grows to a length of 17 mm (0.7 in). The body is reddish-brown, with a shiny, smooth, hairless dorsum. The pygidium and underside are slightly paler than the rest of the body, while the head, pronotum, legs, and the base of the elytra are darker.

== Taxonomy ==
Miridiba axanensis was formally described in 2020 by the French entomologist Denis Keith on the basis of a male specimen collected from Axan in Tây Giang district, Vietnam. The species is named after its type locality.

== Description ==
Miridiba axanensis is a stout beetle that grows to a length of 17 mm (0.7 in). Males have shiny, smooth dorsums that are reddish-brown in colour. The pygidium and underside are slightly paler than the rest of the body, while the head, pronotum, legs, and the base of the elytra are darker. Like other members of its genus, M. axanensis has 10-segmented antennae, 3-segmented antennal clubs, parameres made of many apophyses, accessory denticles on the claws, a clypeus that is shorter than the frons, extensive punctures on the pronotum, and a hairy mentum with a notch towards its front edge.

M. axanensis is quite similar in appearance to M. sinensis, M. pseudosinensis, and M. quasisinensis. Compared to those species, M. axanensis can be distinguished by the shape of its aedeagus, which has two pairs of apophyses.

== Distribution ==
Miridiba axanensis is an endemic of Vietnam, where it has been collected only from Tây Giang district in Quảng Nam province, at an altitude of 1,300 m (4,300 ft).
