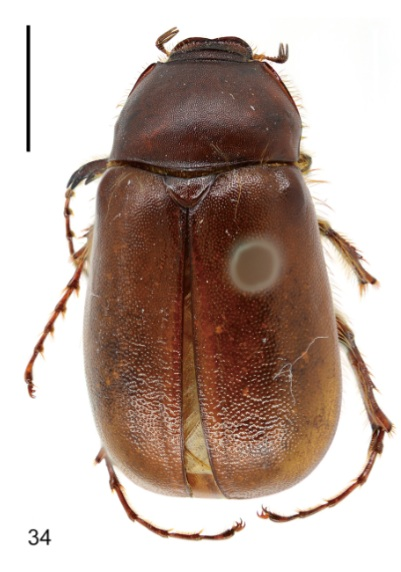

Scientific classification
- Kingdom: Animalia
- Phylum: Arthropoda
- Class: Insecta
- Order: Coleoptera
- Suborder: Polyphaga
- Infraorder: Scarabaeiformia
- Family: Scarabaeidae
- Genus: Miridiba
- Species: M. frontalis

Binomial name
- Miridiba frontalis (Fairmaire, 1886)

Synonyms
- Rhizotrogus frontalis Fairmaire, 1886

= Miridiba frontalis =

Species of beetle

Miridiba frontalis is a species of beetle of the family Scarabaeidae. It is found in China (Guizhou, Hainan, Sichuan, Yunnan).

== Description ==
Adults reach a length of about 17–19.5 mm. The body surface has conspicuous pubescence on the frons, basal part of the elytra and pygidium. The pronotum is without pubescence on the disc, but there are short setae on the anterior margin. The lateral margins are smooth and glabrous. The elytra have conspicuous pubescence on the basal part, but the disc is glabrous.

== Taxonomy ==
Keith transferred Rhizotrogus frontalis to Miridiba and synonymized it with Miridiba castanea in 2005. It was reinstated as a valid species in 2021.
