= Miridiba parasinensis =

Scientific classification
- Kingdom: Animalia
- Phylum: Arthropoda
- Clade: Pancrustacea
- Class: Insecta
- Order: Coleoptera
- Suborder: Polyphaga
- Infraorder: Scarabaeiformia
- Family: Scarabaeidae
- Genus: Miridiba
- Species: M. parasinensis

Binomial name
- Miridiba parasinensis Keith, 2020

Species of beetle

Miridiba parasinensis is a species of beetle of the family Scarabaeidae. It is endemic to Vietnam, where it has only been recorded from the Tây Giang district in Quảng Nam province. It is a stout beetle that grows to a length of 18 mm (0.7 in). The body is reddish-brown, with a shiny, smooth, hairless dorsum. The pygidium and underside are slightly paler than the rest of the body, while the head, pronotum, legs, and the base of the elytra are darker.

== Taxonomy ==
Miridiba parasinensis was formally described in 2020 by the French entomologist Denis Keith on the basis of a male specimen collected from Axan in Tây Giang district, Vietnam. The species is named after its similarity to M. sinensis.

== Description ==
Miridiba parasinensis is a stout beetle that grows to a length of 18 mm (0.7 in), with females being slightly larger than males. They have shiny, smooth dorsums that are reddish-brown in colour. The pygidium and underside are slightly paler than the rest of the body, while the head, pronotum, legs, and the base of the elytra are darker. Like other members of its genus, M. parasinensis has 10-segmented antennae, 3-segmented antennal clubs, parameres made of many apophyses, accessory denticles on the claws, a clypeus that is shorter than the frons, extensive punctures on the pronotum, and a hairy mentum with a notch towards its front edge.

Compared to M. sinensis, M. parasinensis has can be distinguished by its aedeagus, which has asymmetrical and curved parameres when viewed from above. It is smaller than both M. sinensis and M. pseudosinensis, the absence of scalloping along the sides of the pronotum, and a duller appearance caused by the punctures in its elytra. Compared to M. quasisinensis, it differs in the lack of hair on the pronotum.

== Distribution ==
Miridiba parasinensis is an endemic of Vietnam, where it has been collected only from Tây Giang district in Quảng Nam province, at an altitude of 1,300 m (4,300 ft).
