= Miridiba malaccensis =

Scientific classification
- Kingdom: Animalia
- Phylum: Arthropoda
- Clade: Pancrustacea
- Class: Insecta
- Order: Coleoptera
- Suborder: Polyphaga
- Infraorder: Scarabaeiformia
- Family: Scarabaeidae
- Genus: Miridiba
- Species: M. malaccensis

Binomial name
- Miridiba malaccensis (Moser, 1912)

Synonyms
- Holotrichia malaccensis Moser, 1912

Species of beetle

Miridiba malaccensis is a species of beetle of the family Scarabaeidae. It is found in Malaysia.

== Description ==
Adults reach a length of about 25 mm (0.98 in). They are similar to Miridiba saigonensis, but they are more robust and easily distinguished by the shape of the pronotum. The head is coarsely and densely punctate. On the frons, the punctures are somewhat more widely spaced next to the clypeal suture. The vertex is strongly keeled, the anterior margin of the clypeus is slightly upturned, with a blunt triangular notch in the middle and rounded off beside the notch. The pronotum is even more densely punctate than in M. saigonensis. The elytra are quite densely punctate, and the ribs are indicated by smooth longitudinal striae. On the pygidium, the rather coarse punctures are widely spaced. The chest is covered in yellow hairs, the abdomen is not densely punctured, and the punctures are somewhat fainter than in M. saigonensis.
