= Miridiba sinensoides =

Scientific classification
- Kingdom: Animalia
- Phylum: Arthropoda
- Clade: Pancrustacea
- Class: Insecta
- Order: Coleoptera
- Suborder: Polyphaga
- Infraorder: Scarabaeiformia
- Family: Scarabaeidae
- Genus: Miridiba
- Species: M. sinensoides

Binomial name
- Miridiba sinensoides Keith, 2020

Species of beetle

Miridiba sinensoides is a species of beetle of the family Scarabaeidae. It is endemic to Vietnam, where it has only been recorded from the Tây Giang district in Quảng Nam province. It is a stout beetle that grows to a length of 17 mm (0.7 in). The body is reddish-brown, with a shiny, smooth, hairless dorsum. The pygidium and underside are slightly paler than the rest of the body, while the head, pronotum, legs, and the base of the elytra are darker.

== Taxonomy ==
Miridiba sinensoides was formally described in 2020 by the French entomologist Denis Keith on the basis of a male specimen collected from Axan in Tây Giang district, Vietnam. The species is named after its similarity to M. sinensis.

== Description ==
Miridiba sinensoides is a stout beetle that grows to a length of 17 mm (0.7 in). Males have shiny, smooth dorsums that are reddish-brown in colour. The pygidium and underside are slightly paler than the rest of the body, while the head, pronotum, legs, and the base of the elytra are darker. Like other members of its genus, M. sinensoides has 10-segmented antennae, 3-segmented antennal clubs, parameres made of many apophyses, accessory denticles on the claws, a clypeus that is shorter than the frons, extensive punctures on the pronotum, and a hairy mentum with a notch towards its front edge.

M. sinensoides is quite similar in appearance to M. sinensis, M. pseudosinensis, M. quasisinensis, and M. parasinensis. Compared to all of those species, M. sinensoides can be distinguished by the shape of its aedeagus. Its aedeagus is similar to that of M. sinensis, but more elongated and somewhat asymmetrical, with two lobes on the upper ridge. The pit along the sides of the pronotum in M. sinensoides is also slightly more prominent than in the other species.

== Distribution ==
Miridiba sinensoides is an endemic of Vietnam, where it has been collected only from Tây Giang district in Quảng Nam province, at an altitude of 1,300 m (4,300 ft).
