= Cô Bắc =

Vietnamese revolutionary fighter

Nguyen Thi Bac (1908–1943), also known as Co Bac, was a Vietnamese revolutionary fighter. She is one of the leaders of the Yen Bai mutiny.

== Biography ==
She was born in 1908 in Tho Xuong Street in Lang Thuong (now Bac Giang City, Bac Giang Province). Her parents are Nguyen Van Cao and Nguyen Thi Luu. Cao was involved in the movement of Đông Kinh Nghĩa Thục (Tonkin Free School), and was exiled to Côn Đảo by the French colonial empire.

Under the influence of her father, at the age of 18, she and her biological sister, Nguyen Thi Giang (Cô Giang), joined Nguyen Khac Nhu's Hội Quốc dân dục tài, and later Việt Nam Quốc Dân Đảng, working toward the goal of national independence.

In the Yên Bái mutiny, she was assigned by the head of the Communist Party Nguyen Thai Giao to be in charge of propaganda, military logistics and delivery. It was she and other women who delivered bombs from Xuan Lung village (Lam Thao district, Phu Tho province) to the train to Yen Bai to prepare for the February 1930 uprising. The Yen Bai insurrection was unsuccessful, and Cô Bắc and her comrades were arrested and sentenced to five years of probation on 28 March 1930 in Yen Bai.

In 1936, she was freed, and with her husband Pham Quang Sau, who was also a member of the Việt Nam Quốc Dân Đảng, opened a shop named Bôvô in Bac Ninh town to make contact with patriots. However, she died early in 1943, at the age of 35.

== Legacy ==
Nowadays, many streets and schools in Vietnam are named after her.
