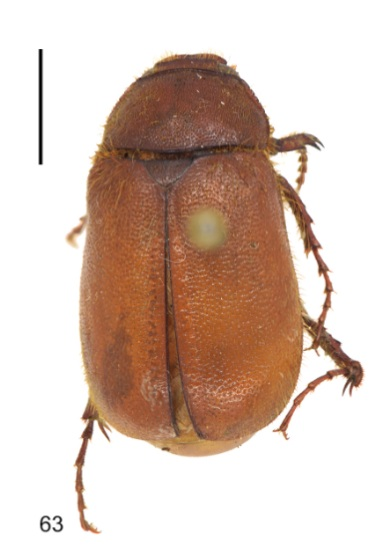

Scientific classification
- Kingdom: Animalia
- Phylum: Arthropoda
- Class: Insecta
- Order: Coleoptera
- Suborder: Polyphaga
- Infraorder: Scarabaeiformia
- Family: Scarabaeidae
- Genus: Miridiba
- Species: M. wangi

Binomial name
- Miridiba wangi (Zhang & Li, 1997)

Synonyms
- Holotrichia (Pledina) wangi Zhang & Li, 1997

= Miridiba wangi =

Species of beetle

Miridiba wangi is a species of beetle of the family Scarabaeidae. It is found in China (Chongqing).

== Description ==
Adults reach a length of about 16.5–17.2 mm. The dorsal surface is densely pubescent. The pronotal anterior margin has short setae and the lateral margins are strongly serrated, with short setae. The scutellum is pubescent and the elytra have pubescence, which is longer on the basal surface.
