= Tam Giang =

Tam Giang may refer to several places in Vietnam, including:

- Tam Giang, Đắk Lắk, a rural commune of Krông Năng District
- Tam Giang, Cà Mau, a rural commune of Năm Căn District
- Tam Giang, Quảng Nam, a rural commune of Núi Thành District
- Tam Giang, Bắc Ninh, a rural commune of Yên Phong District
