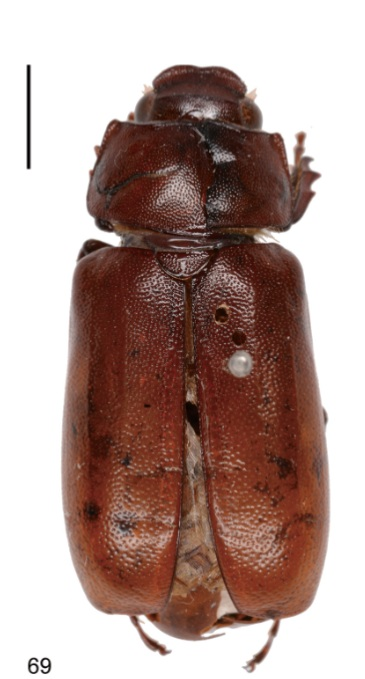

Scientific classification
- Kingdom: Animalia
- Phylum: Arthropoda
- Class: Insecta
- Order: Coleoptera
- Suborder: Polyphaga
- Infraorder: Scarabaeiformia
- Family: Scarabaeidae
- Genus: Miridiba
- Species: M. dohrni

Binomial name
- Miridiba dohrni (Brenske, 1894)

Synonyms
- Holotrichia dohrni Brenske, 1894

= Miridiba dohrni =

Species of beetle

Miridiba dohrni is a species of beetle of the family Scarabaeidae. It is found in Indonesia (Sumatra).

== Description ==
Adults reach a length of about 23–25 mm. The dorsal surface is glabrous and shiny. The pronotal surface is densely punctate and the anterior margin is glabrous, narrowed at the middle and at the sides and without concavities at the lateral ends. The posterior margin is glabrous, at most with very short setae at the sides and the lateral margins are smooth and glabrous. The elytra are shiny, with punctures denser at the base than at the apices.
