= Miridiba kuatunensis =

Scientific classification
- Kingdom: Animalia
- Phylum: Arthropoda
- Class: Insecta
- Order: Coleoptera
- Suborder: Polyphaga
- Infraorder: Scarabaeiformia
- Family: Scarabaeidae
- Genus: Miridiba
- Species: M. kuatunensis

Binomial name
- Miridiba kuatunensis Gao & Fang, 2018

Species of beetle

Miridiba kuatunensis is a species of beetle of the family Scarabaeidae. It is found in China (Fujian, Guangdong, Guangxi, Hainan, Zhejiang).

== Description ==
Adults reach a length of about 17.3–18.5 mm. They have a strongly convex, oval-elongate body. The head, pronotum, scutellum and legs are dark reddish brown, while the antennae, elytra and abdomen are brown to dark brown. The dorsal surface is densely setiferous and the setae are short.

== Etymology ==
The species is named after its type locality, Guadun (Kuatun) in Wuyishan of Fujian province.
