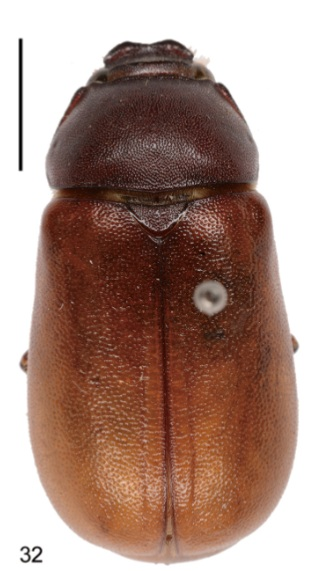

Scientific classification
- Kingdom: Animalia
- Phylum: Arthropoda
- Clade: Pancrustacea
- Class: Insecta
- Order: Coleoptera
- Suborder: Polyphaga
- Infraorder: Scarabaeiformia
- Family: Scarabaeidae
- Genus: Miridiba
- Species: M. excisa

Binomial name
- Miridiba excisa (Moser, 1913)

Synonyms
- Holotrichia excisa Moser, 1913

= Miridiba excisa =

Species of beetle

Miridiba excisa is a species of beetle of the family Scarabaeidae. It is found in India (Karnataka, Tamil Nadu) and Myanmar.

== Description ==
Adults reach a length of about 19.3–20.2 mm. The dorsal surface is glabrous and the anterior margin of the pronotum has short and sparse setae, while the lateral margins are smooth and glabrous. The scutellum is triangular, glabrous and densely punctate and the elytra are glabrous.
