= Miridiba bannaensis =

Scientific classification
- Kingdom: Animalia
- Phylum: Arthropoda
- Class: Insecta
- Order: Coleoptera
- Suborder: Polyphaga
- Infraorder: Scarabaeiformia
- Family: Scarabaeidae
- Genus: Miridiba
- Species: M. bannaensis

Binomial name
- Miridiba bannaensis Gao & Fang, 2018

Species of beetle

Miridiba bannaensis is a species of beetle of the family Scarabaeidae. It is found in China (Yunnan) and Vietnam.

== Description ==
Adults reach a length of about 19.4–20.4 mm. They have a strongly convex, oval-elongate body. The head, pronotum, scutellum and legs are dark reddish brown, while the antennae, elytra and abdomen are dark brown to dark reddish brown. The dorsal surface is glabrous.

== Etymology ==
The species is named after its type locality, Xishuangbanna.
