= Miridiba quasisinensis =

Scientific classification
- Kingdom: Animalia
- Phylum: Arthropoda
- Clade: Pancrustacea
- Class: Insecta
- Order: Coleoptera
- Suborder: Polyphaga
- Infraorder: Scarabaeiformia
- Family: Scarabaeidae
- Genus: Miridiba
- Species: M. quasisinensis

Binomial name
- Miridiba quasisinensis Keith, 2020

Species of beetle

Miridiba quasisinensis is a species of beetle of the family Scarabaeidae. It is endemic to Vietnam, where it has only been recorded from Kon Tum ward in Quảng Ngãi province. It is a stout beetle that grows to a length of 22 mm (0.9 in). The body is reddish-brown, with a shiny, smooth, hairless dorsum. The pygidium and underside are slightly paler than the rest of the body, while the head, pronotum, and legs are darker.

== Taxonomy ==
Miridiba quasisinensis was formally described in 2020 by the French entomologist Denis Keith on the basis of a male specimen collected from Mount Ngọc Linh in Kon Tum, Vietnam. The species is named after its similarity to M. sinensis.

== Description ==
Miridiba quasisinensis is a stout beetle that grows to a length of 22 mm (0.9 in). Males have shiny, smooth dorsums that are reddish-brown in colour. The pygidium and underside are slightly paler than the rest of the body, while the head, pronotum, and legs are darker. Like other members of its genus, M. quasisinensis has 10-segmented antennae, 3-segmented antennal clubs, parameres made of many apophyses, accessory denticles on the claws, a clypeus that is shorter than the frons, extensive punctures on the pronotum, and a hairy mentum with a notch towards its front edge.

M. quasisinensis is quite similar in appearance to M. sinensis, and M. pseudosinensis. Compared to those species, M. quasisinensis can be distinguished by its longer aedeagus which curves smoothly (instead of sharply) along the lower surface, has a narrow dorsal notch that is constricted to the base, and has a translucent area along the sides. It also has cilia on the edges of the pronotum. When compared to M. axanensis, M. quasisinensis differs again in the shape of its aedeagus; the former species has two pairs of apophyses.

== Distribution ==
Miridiba quasisinensis is an endemic of Vietnam, where it has been collected only from Kon Tum ward in Quảng Ngãi province, at an altitude of 1,700 m (5,600 ft).
