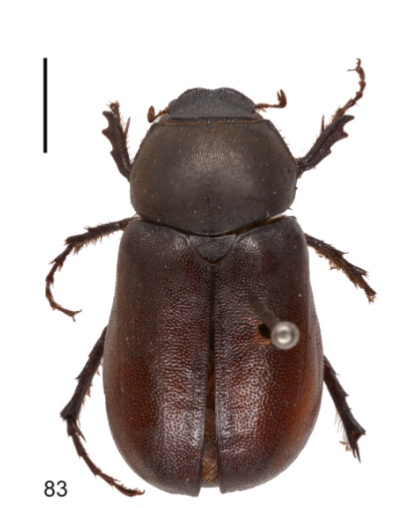

Scientific classification
- Kingdom: Animalia
- Phylum: Arthropoda
- Class: Insecta
- Order: Coleoptera
- Suborder: Polyphaga
- Infraorder: Scarabaeiformia
- Family: Scarabaeidae
- Genus: Miridiba
- Species: M. sinensis

Binomial name
- Miridiba sinensis (Hope, 1842)

Synonyms
- Holotrichia sinensis Hope, 1842; Holotrichia dalatensis Frey, 1970; Rhizotrogus cribellatus Fairmaire, 1891; Ancylonycha sinae Blanchard, 1851; Holotrichia sinae Blanchard, 1851

= Miridiba sinensis =

Species of beetle

Miridiba sinensis is a species of beetle of the family Scarabaeidae. It is found in China (Fujian, Hainan, Guangdong, Guangxi, Guizhou, Hainan, Hong Kong, Hubei, Hunan, Jiangsu, Jiangxi, Shandong, Sichuan, Yunnan, Zhejiang), Taiwan and Vietnam.

== Description ==
Adults reach a length of about 19.5–23 mm. They are dark reddish brown to nearly piceous on the head, pronotum, scutellum, venter, and legs and reddish brown to dark rufo-testaceous on the elytra. The antennae are yellowish brown to dark reddish brown. The body is thick with the dorsum completely glabrous.
