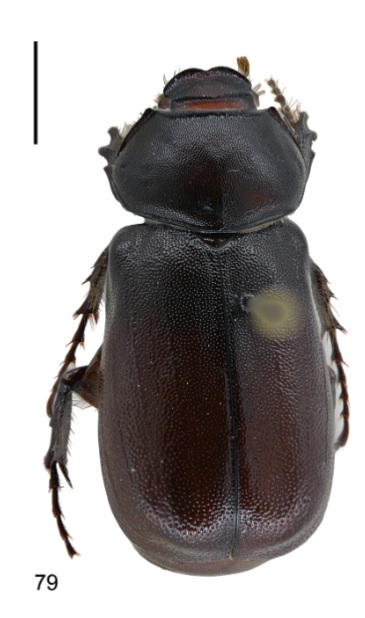

Scientific classification
- Kingdom: Animalia
- Phylum: Arthropoda
- Clade: Pancrustacea
- Class: Insecta
- Order: Coleoptera
- Suborder: Polyphaga
- Infraorder: Scarabaeiformia
- Family: Scarabaeidae
- Genus: Miridiba
- Species: M. waterstradti

Binomial name
- Miridiba waterstradti (Moser, 1914)

Synonyms
- Holotrichia waterstradti Moser, 1914

= Miridiba waterstradti =

Species of beetle

Miridiba waterstradti is a species of beetle of the family Scarabaeidae. It is found in Indonesia (Kalimantan) and Brunei.

== Description ==
Adults reach a length of about 24–26 mm. The dorsal surface is glabrous. The scutellum is without punctures at the middle line and the elytral surface has regularly distributed punctures, each puncture with a tiny bulge.
