= Miridiba bengalensis =

Scientific classification
- Kingdom: Animalia
- Phylum: Arthropoda
- Class: Insecta
- Order: Coleoptera
- Suborder: Polyphaga
- Infraorder: Scarabaeiformia
- Family: Scarabaeidae
- Genus: Miridiba
- Species: M. bengalensis

Binomial name
- Miridiba bengalensis (Brenske, 1894)

Synonyms
- Holotrichia bengalensis Brenske, 1894

Species of beetle

Miridiba bengalensis is a species of beetle of the family Scarabaeidae. It is found in Bangladesh.
