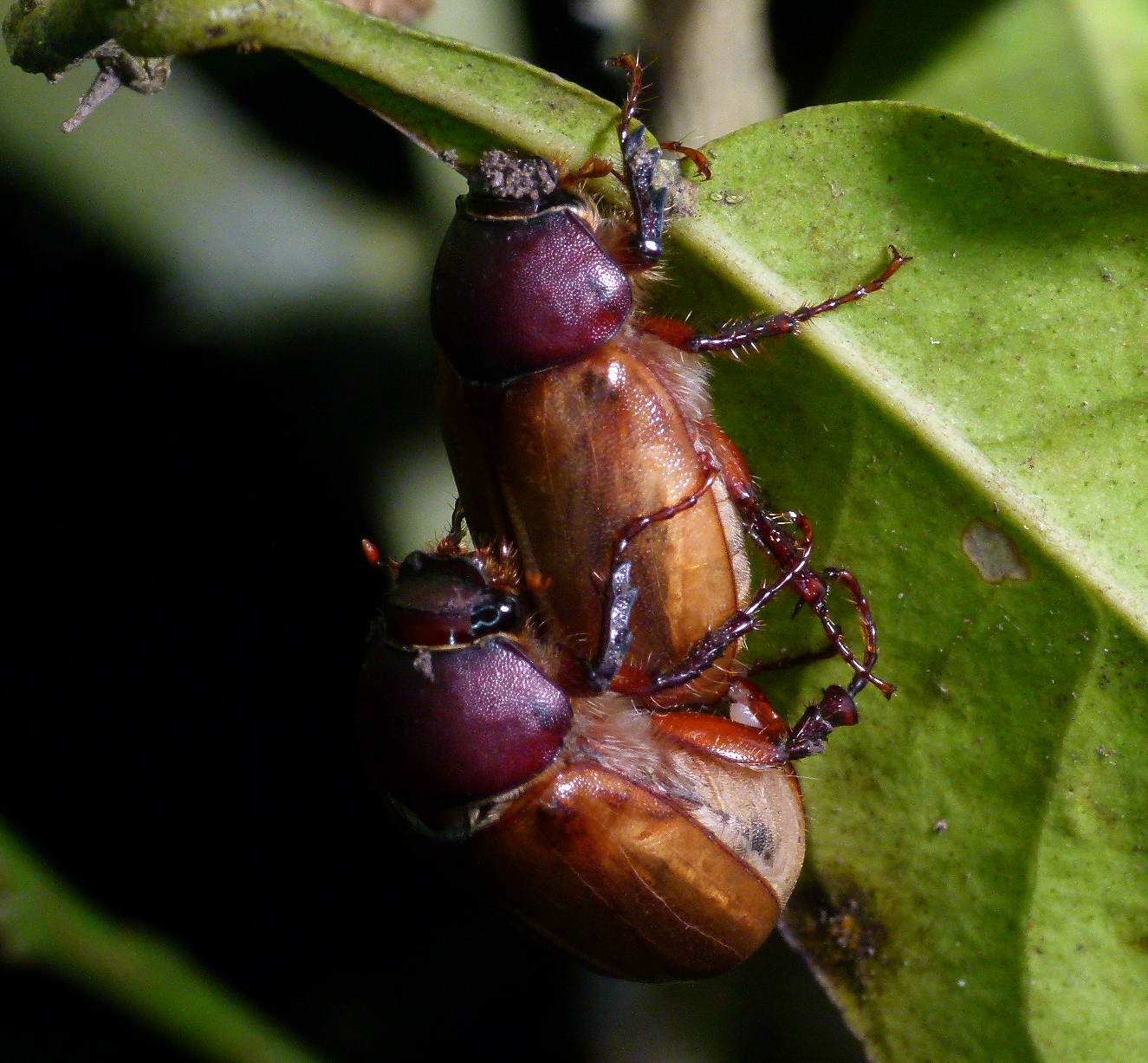
- Miridiba sp.

Scientific classification
- Kingdom: Animalia
- Phylum: Arthropoda
- Clade: Pancrustacea
- Class: Insecta
- Order: Coleoptera
- Suborder: Polyphaga
- Infraorder: Scarabaeiformia
- Family: Scarabaeidae
- Tribe: Rhizotrogini
- Genus: Miridiba; Reitter, 1902

Type species
- Miridiba trichophora (Fairmaire, 1891)

Subgenera
- see text

Synonyms
- Holotrochus Brenske, 1894 (Homonym); Shangaia Lucas, 1920; Hippotrichia Arrow, 1948; Neodontocnema Arrow, 1948

= Miridiba =

Genus of beetles

Miridiba is a genus of beetles in the family Scarabaeidae, which are known for their white larvae that feed on the roots of plants. The antennae end in a short club (shorter than the basal stalk). The mandible has a wrinkled molar lobe and the incisor lobe is depressed above. The labrum is depressed in the middle. Species within this genus are found in the Old World, mainly in eastern and tropical Asia. Many species in the genus were earlier placed in the genus Holotrichia.

== Species ==
=== Subgenus Miridiba (s.s.) ===
- Miridiba abdominalis (Hope, 1831)
- Miridiba aequabilis (Bates, 1891)
- Miridiba bannaensis Gao & Fang, 2018
- Miridiba bengalensis (Brenske, 1894)
- Miridiba bidentata (Burmeister, 1855)
- Miridiba bilobata (Moser, 1913)
- Miridiba borneensis (Moser, 1918)
- Miridiba brancuccii (Sabatinelli, 1983)
- Miridiba brunneipennis (Moser, 1916)
- Miridiba castanea (Waterhouse, 1875)
- Miridiba ciliatipennis (Moser, 1913)
- Miridiba coromandeliana (Blanchard, 1851)
- Miridiba coxalis (Arrow, 1944)
- Miridiba diversiceps (Moser, 1912)
- Miridiba dohrni (Brenske, 1894)
- Miridiba excisa (Moser, 1913)
- Miridiba frontalis (Fairmaire, 1886)
- Miridiba furcillata Keith & Sabatinelli, 2010
- Miridiba gravida (Sharp, 1881)
- Miridiba gressitti (Frey, 1970)
- Miridiba hanoiensis (Keith, 2006)
- Miridiba herteli (Frey, 1971)
- Miridiba hirsuta Itoh, 2001
- Miridiba huesiotoi Li & Yang, 2015
- Miridiba hybrida (Moser, 1912)
- Miridiba imitatrix (Brenske, 1899)
- Miridiba koreana Niijima & Kinoshita, 1923
- Miridiba kuatunensis Gao & Fang, 2018
- Miridiba kuraruana Nomura, 1977
- Miridiba laosana (Moser, 1912)
- Miridiba leucophthalma (Wiedemann, 1819)
- Miridiba longula (Moser, 1912)
- Miridiba malaccensis (Moser, 1912)
- Miridiba newari (Sabatinelli & Migliaccio, 1982)
- Miridiba nigrescens (Moser, 1916)
- Miridiba obscura Itoh, 1995
- Miridiba pilosella (Moser, 1908)
- Miridiba pseudosinensis Keith, 2010
- Miridiba recta Keith & Sabatinelli, 2010
- Miridiba rugaticollis (Moser, 1913)
- Miridiba saigonensis (Moser, 1912)
- Miridiba schoolmeesteri Keith, 2010
- Miridiba scutata (Reitter, 1902)
- Miridiba siamensis Keith, 2004
- Miridiba sus (Moser, 1912)
- Miridiba taipei Li & Wang, 2015
- Miridiba taoi Li & Wang, 2015
- Miridiba thai Keith, 2010
- Miridiba trichophora (Fairmaire, 1891)
- Miridiba tuberculipennis (Moser, 1913)
- Miridiba vethi (Moser, 1914)
- Miridiba wangi (Li & Zhang, 1997)
- Miridiba waterstradti (Moser, 1912)
- Miridiba xingkei Gao & Fang, 2018
- Miridiba youweii Gao & Fang, 2018

=== Subgenus Pledina ===
- Miridiba axanensis Keith, 2020
- Miridiba enigmatica Keith, 2020
- Miridiba lamellata Gao & Fang, 2019
- Miridiba parasinensis Keith, 2020
- Miridiba quasisinensis Keith, 2020
- Miridiba sinensis (Hope, 1842)
- Miridiba sinensoides Keith, 2020
