= Miridiba taoi =

Scientific classification
- Kingdom: Animalia
- Phylum: Arthropoda
- Class: Insecta
- Order: Coleoptera
- Suborder: Polyphaga
- Infraorder: Scarabaeiformia
- Family: Scarabaeidae
- Genus: Miridiba
- Species: M. taoi

Binomial name
- Miridiba taoi Wang & Li, 2015

Species of beetle

Miridiba taoi is a species of beetle of the family Scarabaeidae. It is found in Taiwan.

== Description ==
Adults reach a length of about 14.7–16.6 mm. They are dark reddish brown on the head and pronotum and reddish brown to dark reddish brown on the elytra, venter and legs. The antennae are brown. The dorsum is completely covered with brown, thin, semi-erect, moderately long setae.

== Etymology ==
The species name refers to the Tao tribe, an aboriginal people native to Lanyu Island, which is the type locality of the species.
