= Miridiba aequabilis =

Scientific classification
- Kingdom: Animalia
- Phylum: Arthropoda
- Class: Insecta
- Order: Coleoptera
- Suborder: Polyphaga
- Infraorder: Scarabaeiformia
- Family: Scarabaeidae
- Genus: Miridiba
- Species: M. aequabilis

Binomial name
- Miridiba aequabilis (Bates, 1891)

Synonyms
- Lachnosterna aequabilis Bates, 1891

Species of beetle

Miridiba aequabilis is a species of beetle of the family Scarabaeidae. It is found in China (Guizhou, Sichuan).
