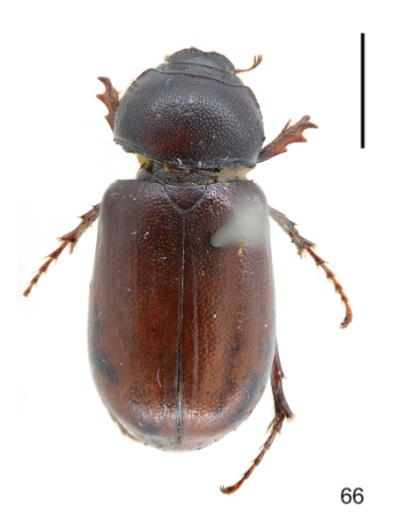

Scientific classification
- Kingdom: Animalia
- Phylum: Arthropoda
- Class: Insecta
- Order: Coleoptera
- Suborder: Polyphaga
- Infraorder: Scarabaeiformia
- Family: Scarabaeidae
- Genus: Miridiba
- Species: M. herteli

Binomial name
- Miridiba herteli (Frey, 1971)

Synonyms
- Holotrichia herteli Frey, 1971

= Miridiba herteli =

Species of beetle

Miridiba herteli is a species of beetle of the family Scarabaeidae. It is found in India (Uttar Pradesh).

== Description ==
Adults reach a length of about 17.2 mm. The dorsal surface is glabrous and dull, at most with hardly visible, tiny setae in each puncture. The pronotal anterior and posterior margins are glabrous, the latter with punctures, except at the middle. The lateral margins are moderately serrated and have short setae. The scutellum is glabrous, with scattered punctures.
