= Giang (name) =

Giang is a Vietnamese name that may refer to

== Surname ==
- Chau Giang (born 1955), Vietnamese-born American poker player
- Cô Giang (1906–1930), Vietnamese revolutionary
- Đinh Thị Trà Giang (born 1992), Vietnamese volleyball player
- Emil Le Giang (born 1991), Slovak football striker of Vietnamese origin
- Hoàng Hà Giang (1991–2015), Vietnamese taekwondo practitioner
- Nguyen Thanh Long Giang (born 1988), Vietnamese footballer
- Patrik Le Giang (born 1992), Slovak football goalkeeper of Vietnamese origin, brother of Emil
- Phan Thanh Giang (born 1981), Vietnamese footballer
- Trà Giang, Vietnamese actress
- Trần Trường Giang (born 1976), Vietnamese football midfielder
- Trần Thị Hương Giang (born 1987), Vietnamese beauty pageant titleholder and fashion model
- Trịnh Giang (1711–1762), Vietnamese ruler
- Trịnh Linh Giang (born 1997), Vietnamese tennis player
- Vũ Giáng Hương (1930–2011), Vietnamese painter
