= Miridiba lamellata =

Scientific classification
- Kingdom: Animalia
- Phylum: Arthropoda
- Class: Insecta
- Order: Coleoptera
- Suborder: Polyphaga
- Infraorder: Scarabaeiformia
- Family: Scarabaeidae
- Genus: Miridiba
- Species: M. lamellata

Binomial name
- Miridiba lamellata Gao & Fang, 2019

Species of beetle

Miridiba lamellata is a species of beetle of the family Scarabaeidae. It is found in China (Guizhou) and Vietnam.
