= Miridiba taipei =

Scientific classification
- Kingdom: Animalia
- Phylum: Arthropoda
- Class: Insecta
- Order: Coleoptera
- Suborder: Polyphaga
- Infraorder: Scarabaeiformia
- Family: Scarabaeidae
- Genus: Miridiba
- Species: M. taipei

Binomial name
- Miridiba taipei Wang & Li, 2015

Species of beetle

Miridiba taipei is a species of beetle of the family Scarabaeidae. It is found in Taiwan.

== Description ==
Adults reach a length of about 14.1–15.5 mm. They are moderately shiny. The head, pronotum, scutellum, legs, and ventral thorax are reddish brown to rufo-testaceous, while the elytra and abdomen are yellowish brown. The antennae are yellowish brown or reddish brown. Both the pronotum and elytra are densely covered with hair-like, long, brownish pale setae.

== Etymology ==
The species name refers to the type locality, Taipei.
