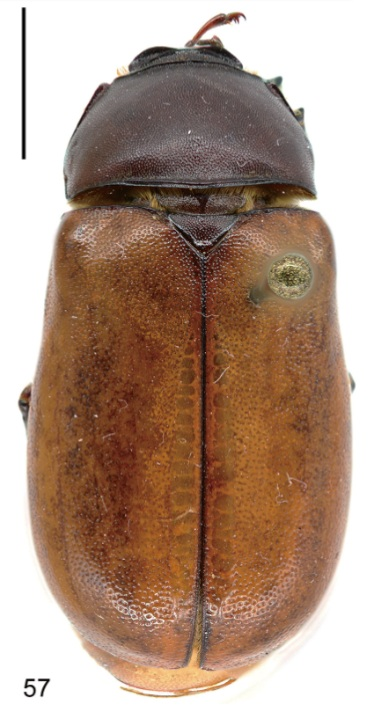

Scientific classification
- Kingdom: Animalia
- Phylum: Arthropoda
- Class: Insecta
- Order: Coleoptera
- Suborder: Polyphaga
- Infraorder: Scarabaeiformia
- Family: Scarabaeidae
- Genus: Miridiba
- Species: M. thai

Binomial name
- Miridiba thai Keith, 2010

= Miridiba thai =

Species of beetle

Miridiba thai is a species of beetle of the family Scarabaeidae. It is found in Thailand.

== Description ==
Adults reach a length of about 20.5 mm. The dorsal surface is glabrous, at most with tiny, hardly visible setae in each puncture. The pronotal posterior margin is glabrous and the lateral margins are smooth and glabrous. The scutellum has dense punctures except at the lateral sides and the elytra have dense punctures (except on the sutural costae).
