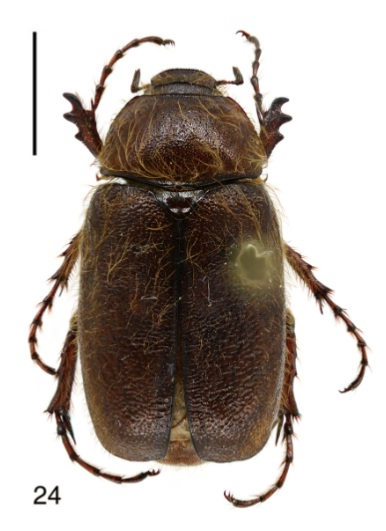

Scientific classification
- Kingdom: Animalia
- Phylum: Arthropoda
- Class: Insecta
- Order: Coleoptera
- Suborder: Polyphaga
- Infraorder: Scarabaeiformia
- Family: Scarabaeidae
- Genus: Miridiba
- Species: M. trichophora

Binomial name
- Miridiba trichophora (Fairmaire, 1891)

Synonyms
- Rhizotrogus trichophorus Fairmaire, 1891; Shangaia vestita Lucas, 1920; Holotrochus vestitus Brenske, 1894

= Miridiba trichophora =

Species of beetle

Miridiba trichophora is a species of beetle of the family Scarabaeidae. It is found in China (Anhui, Beijing, Fujian, Gansu, Guizhou, Hebei, Henan, Hubei, Jiangsu, Jiangxi, Liaoning, Nei Mongol, Ningxia, Shaanxi, Shandong, Shanghai, Shanxi, Sichuan, Tianjin, Zhejiang).

== Description ==
Adults reach a length of about 12.4–18 mm. The dorsal surface has long and yellowish pubescence. The anterior margin of the pronotum has pubescence, but the lateral margins are smooth. The scutellum is glabrous and shiny, with tiny punctures.
