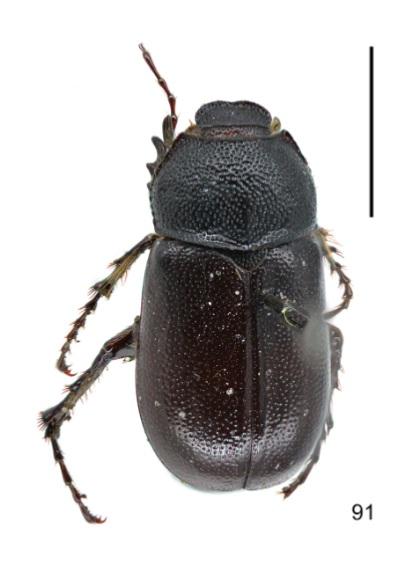

Scientific classification
- Kingdom: Animalia
- Phylum: Arthropoda
- Clade: Pancrustacea
- Class: Insecta
- Order: Coleoptera
- Suborder: Polyphaga
- Infraorder: Scarabaeiformia
- Family: Scarabaeidae
- Genus: Miridiba
- Species: M. nigrescens

Binomial name
- Miridiba nigrescens (Moser, 1916)

Synonyms
- Holotrichia nigrescens Moser, 1916

= Miridiba nigrescens =

Species of beetle

Miridiba nigrescens is a species of beetle of the family Scarabaeidae. It is found in India (Tamil Nadu).

== Description ==
Adults reach a length of about 11.7–13.3 mm. They are reddish brown to black. The dorsal surface is glabrous, at most with hardly visible, short setae in each puncture. The pronotal surface has strong and deep punctures and the scutellum is glabrous, with uniformly distributed punctures. The elytral surface is shiny and has evenly distributed punctures.
