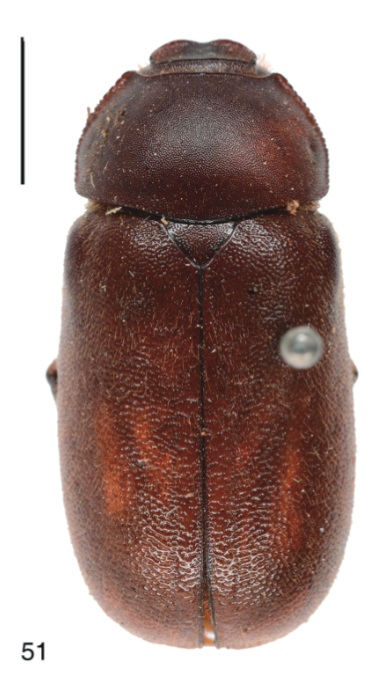

Scientific classification
- Kingdom: Animalia
- Phylum: Arthropoda
- Clade: Pancrustacea
- Class: Insecta
- Order: Coleoptera
- Suborder: Polyphaga
- Infraorder: Scarabaeiformia
- Family: Scarabaeidae
- Genus: Miridiba
- Species: M. pilosella

Binomial name
- Miridiba pilosella (Moser, 1908)

Synonyms
- Holotrichia pilosella Moser, 1908; Holotrichia formosana Moser, 1909

= Miridiba pilosella =

Species of beetle

Miridiba pilosella is a species of beetle of the family Scarabaeidae. It is found in Vietnam, China (Anhui, Fujian, Guangdong, Guangxi, Guizhou, Hebei, Hubei, Jiangsu, Jiangxi, Liaoning, Shandong, Shanxi, Sichuan, Zhejiang) and Taiwan.

== Description ==
Adults reach a length of about 17.4–19 mm. The dorsal surface has conspicuous short pubescence and the pronotal anterior margin has short setae, while the posterior margin is glabrous and the lateral margins are strongly serrated with short setae. The scutellum is densely punctate and the elytra have regularly distributed punctures, which are more scattered and larger than those of the pronotum.
