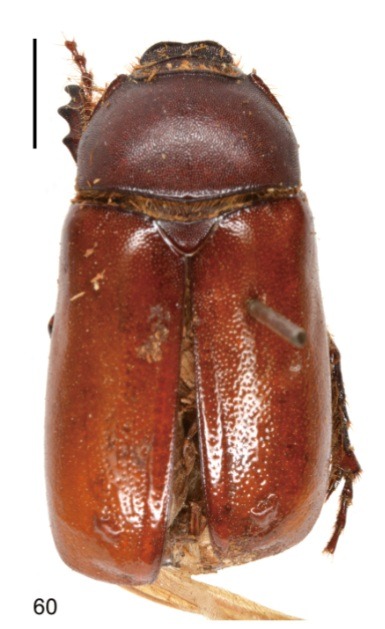

Scientific classification
- Kingdom: Animalia
- Phylum: Arthropoda
- Class: Insecta
- Order: Coleoptera
- Suborder: Polyphaga
- Infraorder: Scarabaeiformia
- Family: Scarabaeidae
- Genus: Miridiba
- Species: M. tuberculipennis

Binomial name
- Miridiba tuberculipennis (Moser, 1913)

Synonyms
- Holotrichia tuberculipennis Moser, 1913; Neodontocnema ardoini Frey, 1970

= Miridiba tuberculipennis =

Species of beetle

Miridiba tuberculipennis is a species of beetle of the family Scarabaeidae. It is found in Laos, Myanmar, Thailand, Vietnam, China (Yunnan) and Japan.

== Description ==
Adults reach a length of about 20–24 mm. The dorsal surface is glabrous, at most with tiny, hardly visible setae in each puncture. The pronotal posterior margin is glabrous, with a row of punctures. The lateral margins are smooth and glabrous. The scutellum is glabrous, with punctures (except at the sides).
