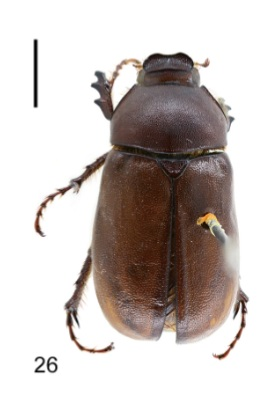

Scientific classification
- Kingdom: Animalia
- Phylum: Arthropoda
- Class: Insecta
- Order: Coleoptera
- Suborder: Polyphaga
- Infraorder: Scarabaeiformia
- Family: Scarabaeidae
- Genus: Miridiba
- Species: M. abdominalis

Binomial name
- Miridiba abdominalis (Hope, 1831)

Synonyms
- Melolontha abdominalis Hope, 1831

= Miridiba abdominalis =

Species of beetle

Miridiba abdominalis is a species of beetle of the family Scarabaeidae. It is found in India (Assam) and Nepal.

== Description ==
Adults reach a length of about 21.5 mm. The dorsal surface is glabrous, sometimes with tiny seta on each puncture. The pronotal anterior margin has, at most, a few short setae and a concavity at each lateral end. The posterior margin is glabrous, with a row of punctures. The lateral margins are smooth and glabrous. The scutellum is also glabrous, with punctures at middle, while the lateral margins are without punctures.
