= Miridiba leucophthalma =

Scientific classification
- Kingdom: Animalia
- Phylum: Arthropoda
- Clade: Pancrustacea
- Class: Insecta
- Order: Coleoptera
- Suborder: Polyphaga
- Infraorder: Scarabaeiformia
- Family: Scarabaeidae
- Genus: Miridiba
- Species: M. leucophthalma

Binomial name
- Miridiba leucophthalma (Wiedemann, 1819)

Synonyms
- Melolontha leucophthalma Wiedemann, 1819; Schizonycha auriculata Redtenbacher, 1868

Species of beetle

Miridiba leucophthalma is a species of beetle of the family Scarabaeidae. It is found in Indonesia (Java).

== Description ==
The dorsal surface is glabrous and the pronotal surface is densely punctate and glabrous.
