= Miridiba longula =

Scientific classification
- Kingdom: Animalia
- Phylum: Arthropoda
- Clade: Pancrustacea
- Class: Insecta
- Order: Coleoptera
- Suborder: Polyphaga
- Infraorder: Scarabaeiformia
- Family: Scarabaeidae
- Genus: Miridiba
- Species: M. longula

Binomial name
- Miridiba longula (Moser, 1912)

Synonyms
- Holotrichia longula Moser, 1912

Species of beetle

Miridiba longula is a species of beetle of the family Scarabaeidae. It is found in Vietnam.

== Description ==
Adults reach a length of about 14 mm (0.55 in). The elytra are shiny and glabrous, with disperse punctures, and only weakly punctate at the apices. The pygidium has pubescence only on the apical margin.
