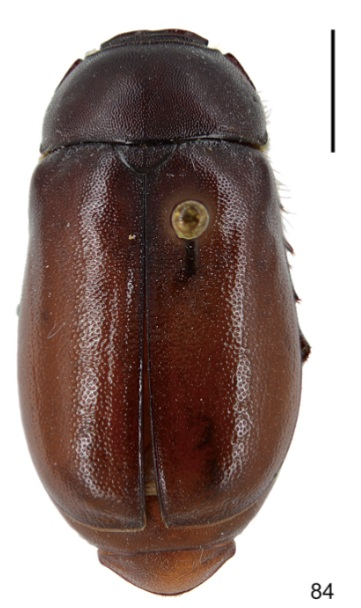

Scientific classification
- Kingdom: Animalia
- Phylum: Arthropoda
- Class: Insecta
- Order: Coleoptera
- Suborder: Polyphaga
- Infraorder: Scarabaeiformia
- Family: Scarabaeidae
- Genus: Miridiba
- Species: M. pseudosinensis

Binomial name
- Miridiba pseudosinensis Keith, 2010

= Miridiba pseudosinensis =

Species of beetle

Miridiba pseudosinensis is a species of beetle of the family Scarabaeidae. It is found in Laos.

== Description ==
Adults reach a length of about 19 mm. The dorsal surface is glabrous. The scutellum is densely punctate and glabrous and the elytral surface has regularly distributed punctures and is also glabrous.
