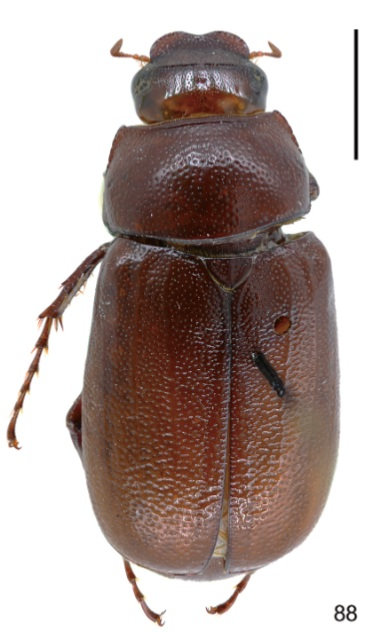

Scientific classification
- Kingdom: Animalia
- Phylum: Arthropoda
- Class: Insecta
- Order: Coleoptera
- Suborder: Polyphaga
- Infraorder: Scarabaeiformia
- Family: Scarabaeidae
- Genus: Miridiba
- Species: M. coxalis

Binomial name
- Miridiba coxalis (Arrow, 1944)

Synonyms
- Holotrichia coxalis Arrow, 1944; Pentelia coxalis

= Miridiba coxalis =

Species of beetle

Miridiba coxalis is a species of beetle of the family Scarabaeidae. It is found in Malaysia (Sarawak).

== Description ==
Adults reach a length of about 22–19.8 mm. The dorsal surface is glabrous. The scutellum has scattered punctures and the elytral surface is glabrous, at most with tiny setae on each puncture, and with weakly defined striations. The punctures are distributed between the striations.
