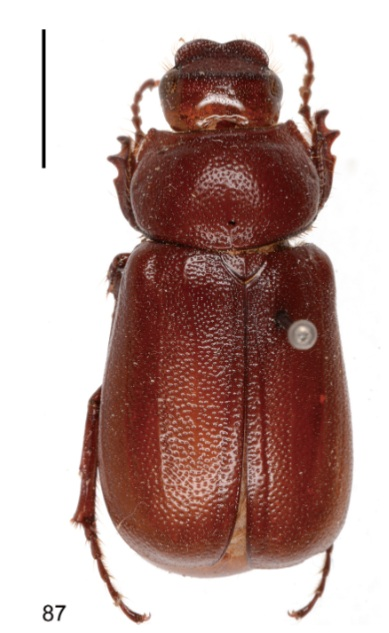

Scientific classification
- Kingdom: Animalia
- Phylum: Arthropoda
- Clade: Pancrustacea
- Class: Insecta
- Order: Coleoptera
- Suborder: Polyphaga
- Infraorder: Scarabaeiformia
- Family: Scarabaeidae
- Genus: Miridiba
- Species: M. borneensis

Binomial name
- Miridiba borneensis (Moser, 1918)

Synonyms
- Holotrichia borneensis Moser, 1918; Pentelia borneensis

= Miridiba borneensis =

Species of beetle

Miridiba borneensis is a species of beetle of the family Scarabaeidae. It is found in Malaysia (Sarawak).

== Description ==
Adults reach a length of about 19 mm. The dorsal surface is glabrous. The scutellum is irregularly punctate and glabrous and the elytral surface is punctate and glabrous, with the costae weakly defined.
