= Trường Giang =

Trường Giang may refer to several places in Vietnam, including:

- Trường Giang, Bắc Giang, a rural commune of Lục Nam District
- Trường Giang, Thanh Hóa, a rural commune of Nông Cống District

It may also refer to

- Trường Giang (actor), Vietnamese actor and television presenter
- the Trường Giang River in the municipality of Da Nang

== See also ==
- Yangtze (Vietnamese: Sông Dương Tử, Trường Giang)
