= Miridiba obscura =

Scientific classification
- Kingdom: Animalia
- Phylum: Arthropoda
- Class: Insecta
- Order: Coleoptera
- Suborder: Polyphaga
- Infraorder: Scarabaeiformia
- Family: Scarabaeidae
- Genus: Miridiba
- Species: M. obscura

Binomial name
- Miridiba obscura Itoh, 1995

Synonyms
- Miribida tuberculipennis obscura Itoh, 1995

Species of beetle

Miridiba obscura is a species of beetle of the family Scarabaeidae. It is found in China (Yunnan), Laos and Thailand.

== Description ==
The dorsal surface is glabrous and the pronotum and scutellum are densely punctate, while the elytral surface is glabrous and punctate.
