= Miridiba brancuccii =

Scientific classification
- Kingdom: Animalia
- Phylum: Arthropoda
- Class: Insecta
- Order: Coleoptera
- Suborder: Polyphaga
- Infraorder: Scarabaeiformia
- Family: Scarabaeidae
- Genus: Miridiba
- Species: M. brancuccii

Binomial name
- Miridiba brancuccii (Sabatinelli, 1983)

Synonyms
- Neodontocnema brancuccii Sabatinelli, 1983

Species of beetle

Miridiba brancuccii is a species of beetle of the family Scarabaeidae. It is found in India (West Bengal).
