= Miridiba youweii =

Scientific classification
- Kingdom: Animalia
- Phylum: Arthropoda
- Class: Insecta
- Order: Coleoptera
- Suborder: Polyphaga
- Infraorder: Scarabaeiformia
- Family: Scarabaeidae
- Genus: Miridiba
- Species: M. youweii

Binomial name
- Miridiba youweii Gao & Fang, 2018

Species of beetle

Miridiba youweii is a species of beetle of the family Scarabaeidae. It is found in China (Guizhou, Yunnan, Zhejiang).

== Description ==
Adults reach a length of about 22–24 mm. They have a strongly convex, oval-elongate body. The head, pronotum, scutellum and legs are dark reddish brown, while the antennae, elytra and abdomen are dark brown. The dorsal surface is densely punctate and glabrous.

== Etymology ==
The species is dedicated to Mr Youwei Zhang.
