= Miridiba gravida =

Scientific classification
- Kingdom: Animalia
- Phylum: Arthropoda
- Class: Insecta
- Order: Coleoptera
- Suborder: Polyphaga
- Infraorder: Scarabaeiformia
- Family: Scarabaeidae
- Genus: Miridiba
- Species: M. gravida

Binomial name
- Miridiba gravida (Sharp, 1881)

Synonyms
- Lachnosterna gravida Sharp, 1881; Holotrichia moffartsi Brenske, 1900

Species of beetle

Miridiba gravida is a species of beetle of the family Scarabaeidae. It is found in Indonesia (Sumatra).
