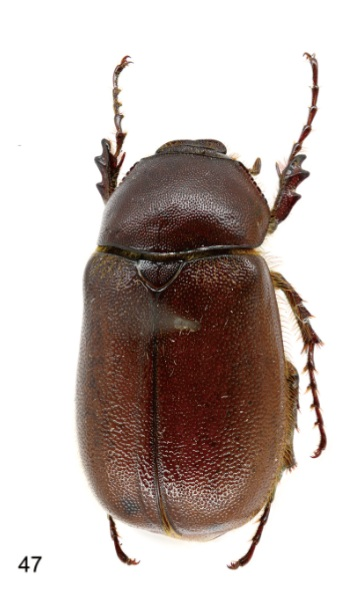

Scientific classification
- Kingdom: Animalia
- Phylum: Arthropoda
- Class: Insecta
- Order: Coleoptera
- Suborder: Polyphaga
- Infraorder: Scarabaeiformia
- Family: Scarabaeidae
- Genus: Miridiba
- Species: M. kuraruana

Binomial name
- Miridiba kuraruana Nomura, 1977

= Miridiba kuraruana =

Species of beetle

Miridiba kuraruana is a species of beetle of the family Scarabaeidae. It is found in Taiwan.

== Description ==
Adults reach a length of about 18.9–20 mm. The dorsal surface is shiny. The frons has conspicuous pubescence and the pronotum has hardly visible short setae in each puncture. Its anterior margin is glabrous or has some short setae, the posterior margin is glabrous and the lateral margins are strongly serrated, with conspicuous short pubescence. The elytra have regularly distributed punctures and the disc has very short setae. The basal and lateral part have conspicuous long pubescence.
