= Miridiba diversiceps =

Scientific classification
- Kingdom: Animalia
- Phylum: Arthropoda
- Clade: Pancrustacea
- Class: Insecta
- Order: Coleoptera
- Suborder: Polyphaga
- Infraorder: Scarabaeiformia
- Family: Scarabaeidae
- Genus: Miridiba
- Species: M. diversiceps

Binomial name
- Miridiba diversiceps (Moser, 1912)

Synonyms
- Holotrichia diversiceps Moser, 1912

Species of beetle

Miridiba diversiceps is a species of beetle of the family Scarabaeidae. It is found in India (Assam, West Bengal).

== Description ==
Adults reach a length of about 18–20 mm (0.71–0.79 in). The dorsal surface is glabrous and the anterior margin of the pronotum has a concavity at each lateral end.
