= Gyang =

Gyang is a Nigerian name that may refer to

Given name

- Gyang Dalyop Datong (1959–2012), Nigerian senator
- Gyang Pwajok (1966–2015), Nigerian politician

Surname

- Jeremiah Gyang (born 1981), Nigerian singer-songwriter, instrumentalist and record producer
- Kenneth Gyang, Nigerian filmmaker
- Ruby Gyang, Nigerian singer and songwriter

== See also ==
- Qungdo’gyang, a village in Tibet
- Giang (disambiguation)
