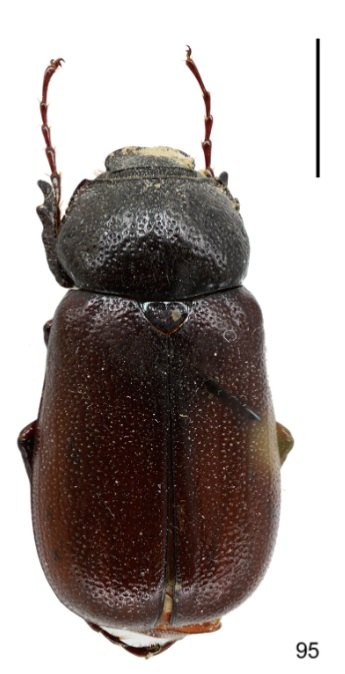

Scientific classification
- Kingdom: Animalia
- Phylum: Arthropoda
- Class: Insecta
- Order: Coleoptera
- Suborder: Polyphaga
- Infraorder: Scarabaeiformia
- Family: Scarabaeidae
- Genus: Miridiba
- Species: M. schoolmeesteri

Binomial name
- Miridiba schoolmeesteri Keith, 2010

= Miridiba schoolmeesteri =

Species of beetle

Miridiba schoolmeesteri is a species of beetle of the family Scarabaeidae. It is found in Vietnam.

== Description ==
Adults reach a length of about 17.7 mm. The dorsal surface is glabrous. The pronotal surface is bulky, with strong, irregularly distributed punctures. The lateral margins of the pronotum are serrated with a few short setae. The scutellum is sparsely punctate. The elytral surface has regularly distributed punctures.
