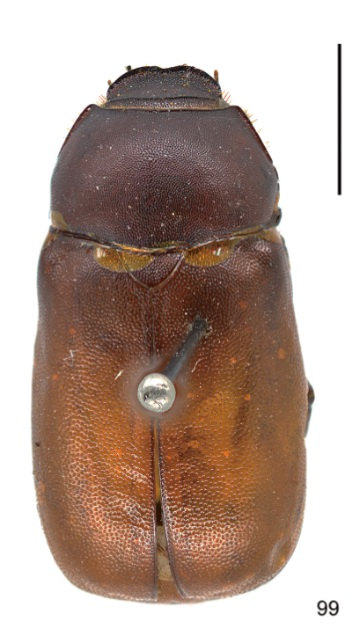

Scientific classification
- Kingdom: Animalia
- Phylum: Arthropoda
- Clade: Pancrustacea
- Class: Insecta
- Order: Coleoptera
- Suborder: Polyphaga
- Infraorder: Scarabaeiformia
- Family: Scarabaeidae
- Genus: Miridiba
- Species: M. brunneipennis

Binomial name
- Miridiba brunneipennis (Moser, 1916)

Synonyms
- Holotrichia brunneipennis Moser, 1916

= Miridiba brunneipennis =

Species of beetle

Miridiba brunneipennis is a species of beetle of the family Scarabaeidae. It is found in India.

== Description ==
The dorsal surface is glabrous and densely punctate. The pronotal surface is densely punctate (with the distance between the punctures smaller than the diameter of a puncture). The anterior pronotal margin and the posterior margin are glabrous, and the lateral margins are smooth. The scutellum is densely punctate and glabrous and the elytral surface is glabrous and punctate.
