= Miridiba siamensis =

Scientific classification
- Kingdom: Animalia
- Phylum: Arthropoda
- Class: Insecta
- Order: Coleoptera
- Suborder: Polyphaga
- Infraorder: Scarabaeiformia
- Family: Scarabaeidae
- Genus: Miridiba
- Species: M. siamensis

Binomial name
- Miridiba siamensis Keith, 2004

Species of beetle

Miridiba siamensis is a species of beetle of the family Scarabaeidae. It is found in Thailand.
