= Miridiba laosana =

Scientific classification
- Kingdom: Animalia
- Phylum: Arthropoda
- Clade: Pancrustacea
- Class: Insecta
- Order: Coleoptera
- Suborder: Polyphaga
- Infraorder: Scarabaeiformia
- Family: Scarabaeidae
- Genus: Miridiba
- Species: M. laosana

Binomial name
- Miridiba laosana (Moser, 1912)

Synonyms
- Holotrichia laosana Moser, 1912

Species of beetle

Miridiba laosana is a species of beetle of the family Scarabaeidae. It is found in Laos, Thailand and Vietnam.

== Description ==
Adults reach a length of about 22–24 mm (0.87–0.94 in). The dorsal surface is glabrous. The lateral margin of the pronotum is weakly serrated with few setae and the elytra are shiny and weakly punctate, but almost without punctures at the apices.
