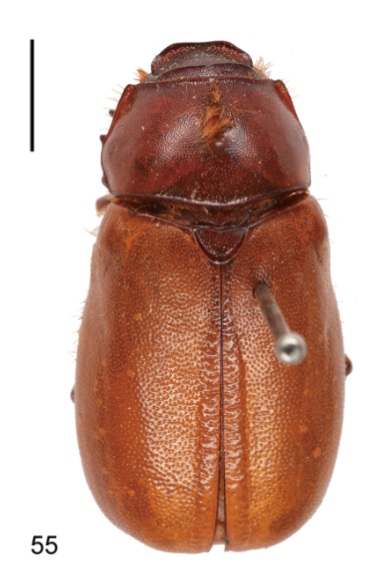

Scientific classification
- Kingdom: Animalia
- Phylum: Arthropoda
- Clade: Pancrustacea
- Class: Insecta
- Order: Coleoptera
- Suborder: Polyphaga
- Infraorder: Scarabaeiformia
- Family: Scarabaeidae
- Genus: Miridiba
- Species: M. sus

Binomial name
- Miridiba sus (Moser, 1912)

Synonyms
- Holotrichia sus Moser, 1912; Hippotrichia hainana Arrow, 1948

= Miridiba sus =

Species of beetle

Miridiba sus is a species of beetle of the family Scarabaeidae. It is found in Laos, Thailand, Vietnam and China (Hainan, Yunnan).

== Description ==
Adults reach a length of about 23 mm (0.91 in). The head and elytra are glabrous. The pronotal surface is also glabrous, but with a tuft of brush-shaped pubescence placed longitudinally on the middle line. Also, the anterior margin is widely flanged with a concavity at each lateral end and pubescent. The lateral margins are smooth. The lateral margins of the scutellum are without punctures and the elytral surface is glabrous.
