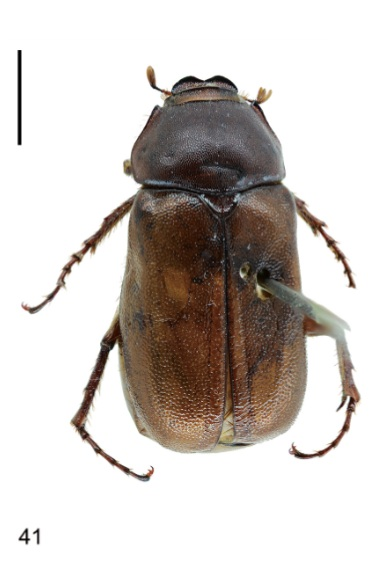

Scientific classification
- Kingdom: Animalia
- Phylum: Arthropoda
- Clade: Pancrustacea
- Class: Insecta
- Order: Coleoptera
- Suborder: Polyphaga
- Infraorder: Scarabaeiformia
- Family: Scarabaeidae
- Genus: Miridiba
- Species: M. hybrida

Binomial name
- Miridiba hybrida (Moser, 1912)

Synonyms
- Holotrichia hybrida Moser, 1912

= Miridiba hybrida =

Species of beetle

Miridiba hybrida is a species of beetle of the family Scarabaeidae. It is found in India (Assam, Meghalaya, Mizoram) and China (Guizhou, Xizang, Yunnan).

== Description ==
Adults reach a length of about 17–19 mm (0.67–0.75 in). The dorsal surface is glabrous. The anterior margin of the pronotum has short and sparse pubescence, while the lateral margins are smooth and glabrous.
