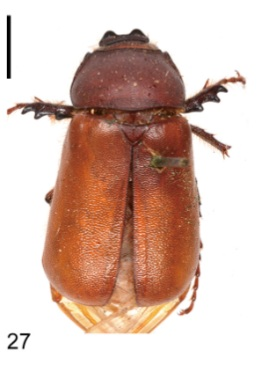

Scientific classification
- Kingdom: Animalia
- Phylum: Arthropoda
- Clade: Pancrustacea
- Class: Insecta
- Order: Coleoptera
- Suborder: Polyphaga
- Infraorder: Scarabaeiformia
- Family: Scarabaeidae
- Genus: Miridiba
- Species: M. bilobata

Binomial name
- Miridiba bilobata (Moser, 1913)

Synonyms
- Holotrichia bilobata Moser, 1913

= Miridiba bilobata =

Species of beetle

Miridiba bilobata is a species of beetle of the family Scarabaeidae. It is found in India (Karnataka, Maharashtra, West Bengal).
