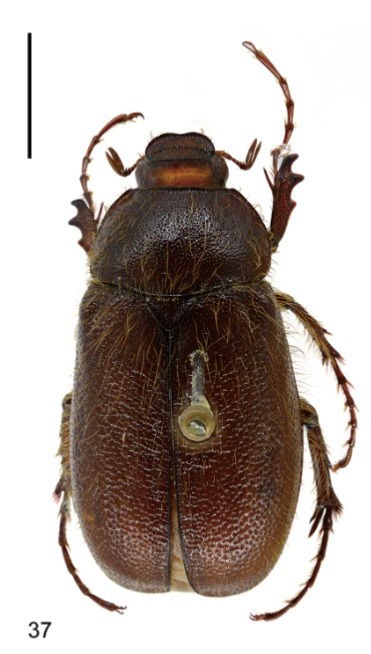

Scientific classification
- Kingdom: Animalia
- Phylum: Arthropoda
- Class: Insecta
- Order: Coleoptera
- Suborder: Polyphaga
- Infraorder: Scarabaeiformia
- Family: Scarabaeidae
- Genus: Miridiba
- Species: M. hirsuta

Binomial name
- Miridiba hirsuta Itoh, 2001

= Miridiba hirsuta =

Species of beetle

Miridiba hirsuta is a species of beetle of the family Scarabaeidae. It is found in Japan (Ryukyu Islands).
