= Miridiba newari =

Scientific classification
- Kingdom: Animalia
- Phylum: Arthropoda
- Class: Insecta
- Order: Coleoptera
- Suborder: Polyphaga
- Infraorder: Scarabaeiformia
- Family: Scarabaeidae
- Genus: Miridiba
- Species: M. newari

Binomial name
- Miridiba newari (Sabatinelli & Migliaccio, 1982)

Synonyms
- Neodontocnema newari Sabatinelli & Migliaccio, 1982

Species of beetle

Miridiba newari is a species of beetle of the family Scarabaeidae. It is found in India (Sikkim) and Nepal.
