= Tây Giang =

Tây Giang Xã Tây Giang
- Rural commune
- Location within Vietnam
- Coordinates: 15°53′11″N 107°29′37″E
- Country: Vietnam
- Region: South Central Coast
- Province: Đà Nẵng
- Time zone: UTC+7 (UTC + 7)

Tây Giang is a rural commune (xã) of Đà Nẵng, Vietnam. It is one of the 93 new wards, communes and special zones of the city following the reorganization in 2025.

On June 16, 2025, the Standing Committee of the National Assembly issued Resolution No. 1659/NQ-UBTVQH15 on the arrangement of commune-level administrative units of Đà Nẵng in 2025. Accordingly, the entire natural area and population of the communes of Atiêng, Dang, Anông, and Lăng (formerly in Tây Giang district of Quảng Nam province) were merged to form a new commune named Tây Giang Commune.
