= Miridiba coromandeliana =

Scientific classification
- Kingdom: Animalia
- Phylum: Arthropoda
- Class: Insecta
- Order: Coleoptera
- Suborder: Polyphaga
- Infraorder: Scarabaeiformia
- Family: Scarabaeidae
- Genus: Miridiba
- Species: M. coromandeliana

Binomial name
- Miridiba coromandeliana (Blanchard, 1851)

Synonyms
- Holotrichia coromandeliana Blanchard, 1851; Holotrichia conferta Sharp, 1903

Species of beetle

Miridiba coromandeliana is a species of beetle of the family Scarabaeidae. It is found in India (Tamil Nadu).

== Description ==
The head is glabrous, except for the vertex with thin pubescence. The pronotum is glabrous on the disc and with, at most, short setae in each puncture.
