= Miridiba furcillata =

Scientific classification
- Kingdom: Animalia
- Phylum: Arthropoda
- Class: Insecta
- Order: Coleoptera
- Suborder: Polyphaga
- Infraorder: Scarabaeiformia
- Family: Scarabaeidae
- Genus: Miridiba
- Species: M. furcillata

Binomial name
- Miridiba furcillata Keith & Sabatinelli, 2010

Species of beetle

Miridiba furcillata is a species of beetle of the family Scarabaeidae. It is found in Nepal.
