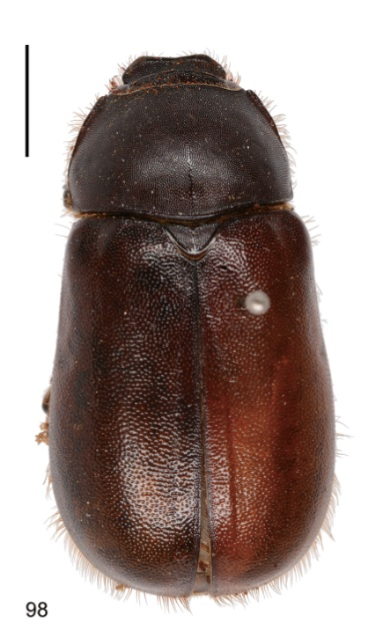

Scientific classification
- Kingdom: Animalia
- Phylum: Arthropoda
- Clade: Pancrustacea
- Class: Insecta
- Order: Coleoptera
- Suborder: Polyphaga
- Infraorder: Scarabaeiformia
- Family: Scarabaeidae
- Genus: Miridiba
- Species: M. ciliatipennis

Binomial name
- Miridiba ciliatipennis (Moser, 1913)

Synonyms
- Holotrichia ciliatipennis Moser, 1913

= Miridiba ciliatipennis =

Species of beetle

Miridiba ciliatipennis is a species of beetle of the family Scarabaeidae. It is found in Thailand and Vietnam.

== Description ==
Adults reach a length of about 23–25 mm. The dorsal surface is glabrous and densely punctate. The anterior pronotal margin is flanged, with a concavity moderately developed at each lateral end. The posterior margin is glabrous and the lateral margins are smooth. The scutellum is densely punctate. The punctures on the elytral surface are more scattered than those on the pronotum.
