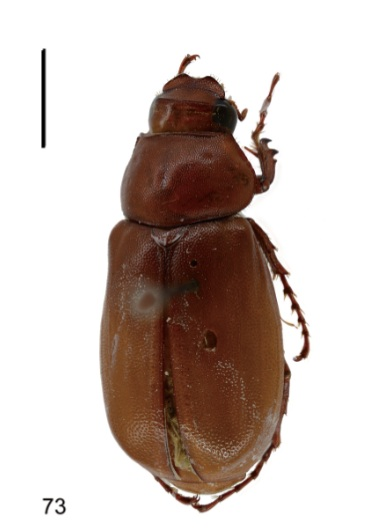

Scientific classification
- Kingdom: Animalia
- Phylum: Arthropoda
- Clade: Pancrustacea
- Class: Insecta
- Order: Coleoptera
- Suborder: Polyphaga
- Infraorder: Scarabaeiformia
- Family: Scarabaeidae
- Genus: Miridiba
- Species: M. bidentata

Binomial name
- Miridiba bidentata (Burmeister, 1855)

Synonyms
- Ancylonycha bidentata Burmeister, 1855; Holotrichia behrensi Brenske, 1892; Lachnosterna convexa Sharp, 1881

= Miridiba bidentata =

Species of beetle

Miridiba bidentata is a species of beetle of the family Scarabaeidae. It is found in Indonesia (Java, Sumatra).

== Description ==
Adults reach a length of about 19.8–20.5 mm. The dorsal surface is glabrous. The anterior, posterior and lateral margins of the pronotum are glabrous. The elytra are more densely punctate at base than at the apices.
