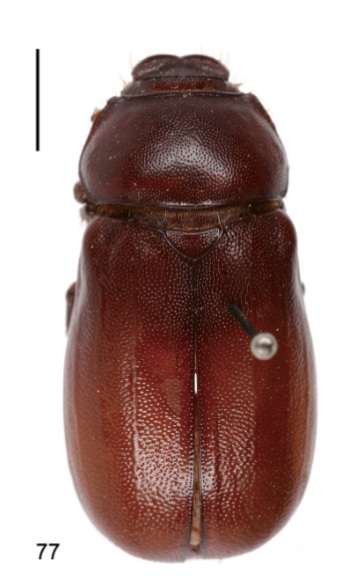

Scientific classification
- Kingdom: Animalia
- Phylum: Arthropoda
- Clade: Pancrustacea
- Class: Insecta
- Order: Coleoptera
- Suborder: Polyphaga
- Infraorder: Scarabaeiformia
- Family: Scarabaeidae
- Genus: Miridiba
- Species: M. vethi

Binomial name
- Miridiba vethi (Moser, 1914)

Synonyms
- Holotrichia vethi Moser, 1914

= Miridiba vethi =

Species of beetle

Miridiba vethi is a species of beetle of the family Scarabaeidae. It is found in Indonesia (Sumatra).

== Description ==
The pronotal surface is densely punctate, each puncture with a tiny, hardly visible bulge. The scutellum is sparsely punctate and the elytral surface has regularly distributed punctures. Each puncture has a tiny, hardly visible bulge.
