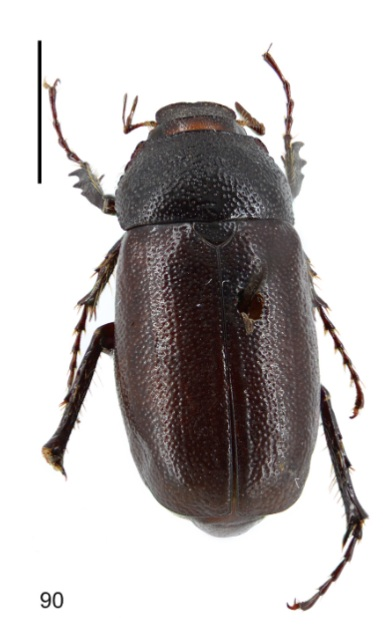

Scientific classification
- Kingdom: Animalia
- Phylum: Arthropoda
- Clade: Pancrustacea
- Class: Insecta
- Order: Coleoptera
- Suborder: Polyphaga
- Infraorder: Scarabaeiformia
- Family: Scarabaeidae
- Genus: Miridiba
- Species: M. rugaticollis

Binomial name
- Miridiba rugaticollis (Moser, 1913)

Synonyms
- Holotrichia rugaticollis Moser, 1913

= Miridiba rugaticollis =

Species of beetle

Miridiba rugaticollis is a species of beetle of the family Scarabaeidae. It is found in India (Karnataka).

== Description ==
Adults reach a length of about 14.7 mm. They are reddish brown to black. The dorsal surface is shiny and glabrous. The pronotal surface has strong and deep punctures and the scutellum is glabrous, with uniformly distributed punctures. The elytral surface has evenly distributed punctures, and is glabrous, at most with hardly visible, short setae in each puncture.
