= Miridiba koreana =

Scientific classification
- Kingdom: Animalia
- Phylum: Arthropoda
- Class: Insecta
- Order: Coleoptera
- Suborder: Polyphaga
- Infraorder: Scarabaeiformia
- Family: Scarabaeidae
- Genus: Miridiba
- Species: M. koreana

Binomial name
- Miridiba koreana Niijima & Kinoshita, 1923

Species of beetle

Miridiba koreana is a species of beetle of the family Scarabaeidae. It is found in Korea.

== Description ==
Adults reach a length of about 13 mm. They have a black head and a shiny, yellowish, elongate-oval body. The upper surface is glabrous.
