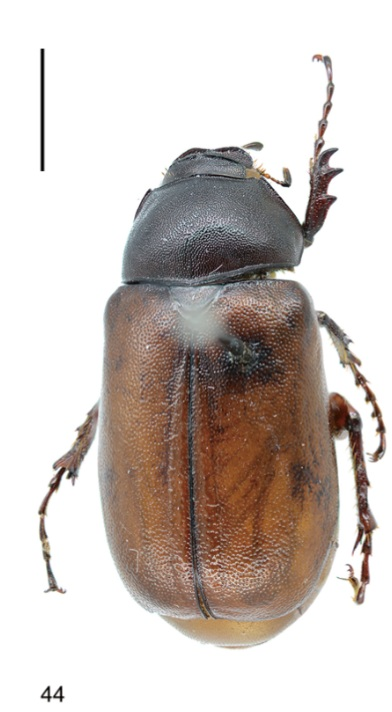

Scientific classification
- Kingdom: Animalia
- Phylum: Arthropoda
- Class: Insecta
- Order: Coleoptera
- Suborder: Polyphaga
- Infraorder: Scarabaeiformia
- Family: Scarabaeidae
- Genus: Miridiba
- Species: M. imitatrix

Binomial name
- Miridiba imitatrix (Brenske, 1899)

Synonyms
- Holotrichia imitatrix Brenske, 1899

= Miridiba imitatrix =

Species of beetle

Miridiba imitatrix is a species of beetle of the family Scarabaeidae. It is found in India (Sikkim).

== Description ==
Adults reach a length of about 21.5 mm. The dorsal surface is glabrous, at most with hardly visible, short setae in each puncture. The pronotal anterior margin has a row of punctures and is glabrous or has some short setae at sides. The lateral margins are smooth and glabrous. The elytra have regularly distributed punctures.
