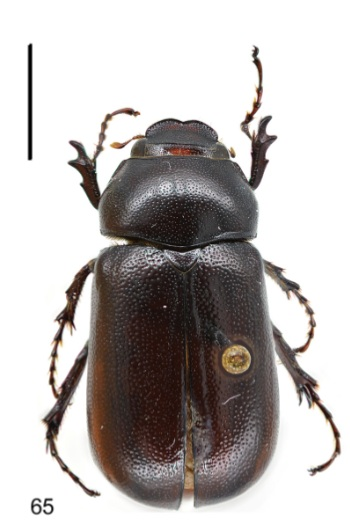

Scientific classification
- Kingdom: Animalia
- Phylum: Arthropoda
- Class: Insecta
- Order: Coleoptera
- Suborder: Polyphaga
- Infraorder: Scarabaeiformia
- Family: Scarabaeidae
- Genus: Miridiba
- Species: M. gressitti

Binomial name
- Miridiba gressitti (Frey, 1970)

Synonyms
- Holotrichia gressitti Frey, 1970

= Miridiba gressitti =

Species of beetle

Miridiba gressitti is a species of beetle of the family Scarabaeidae. It is found in Laos.

== Description ==
Adults reach a length of about 18.6 mm. The dorsal surface is glabrous and shiny. The pronotal anterior and posterior margins are glabrous, the latter with a row of punctures except at the middle. The lateral margins are moderately serrated, almost smooth and with a few short setae. The scutellum is glabrous, with scattered punctures and the sides without punctures. The punctures on the elytra are bigger than those of the pronotum.
