= Miridiba huesiotoi =

Scientific classification
- Kingdom: Animalia
- Phylum: Arthropoda
- Class: Insecta
- Order: Coleoptera
- Suborder: Polyphaga
- Infraorder: Scarabaeiformia
- Family: Scarabaeidae
- Genus: Miridiba
- Species: M. huesiotoi

Binomial name
- Miridiba huesiotoi Li & Yang, 2015

Species of beetle

Miridiba huesiotoi is a species of beetle of the family Scarabaeidae. It is found in Taiwan.

== Description ==
Adults reach a length of about 17.6–20.8 mm. They are moderately shiny and dark reddish brown to rufo-testaceous on the dorsal surface, venter, and legs. The antennae are reddish brown. The dorsum is covered with brownish pale setae.

== Etymology ==
The species name refers to the type locality, Green Island.
