= An Giang Airport =

An Giang Airport Sân bay An Giang
- IATA: ?; ICAO: none

Summary
- Airport type: Public
- Owner: Southern Airports Corporation
- Operator: Southern Airports Authority
- Location: Chau Thanh District
- Coordinates: 10°30′54″N 105°10′26″E

Map
- Location of airport in Vietnam

Runways
Direction	Length		Surface
Direction	ft	m	Surface
		1,850	Asphalt

An Giang Airport is a planned airport in An Giang Province, Mekong Delta, southern Vietnam According to the master plan, total cost is estimated around $64 million and will be invested in phases, the first phase will be constructed from 2011 to 2020. The airport will be located in commune of Cần Đăng, Chau Thanh District, An Giang Province. The airport will cover 235 ha, of which the civil airport area will occupy 34.2 ha while 31.2 ha will be allocated for a military airport area and 169 ha for other purposes.

The airport will have a 3,000-square meter passenger and management terminal and will have an 1,850 meter long runway, 45 meter wide designed to serve ATR72 aircraft by 2020 and then the runway will be expanded to 2400 m and can serve Airbus A320.
