= Cô Giang =

Vietnamese revolutionary

Cô Giang (1906–1930), the popular name of Nguyen Thi Giang, was a Vietnamese revolutionary, fiancee of Nguyen Thai Hoc - leader of Việt Nam Quốc Dân Đảng, the Vietnamese Nationalist Party - and sister of Cô Bắc. Cô Giang committed suicide at Thổ Tang village (now part of Vĩnh Phúc province) after Nguyen Thai Hoc was captured and executed by the French colonial authorities due to the failure of the Yên Bái mutiny.

A high school in Vinh Tuong District, Vinh Phuc province is named after her and many streets in Vietnamese towns and cities are named after her and her sister.
