= Nam Giang district =

Coordinates: 15.4170°N 107.8330°E

Nam Giang district Huyện Nam Giang
- District
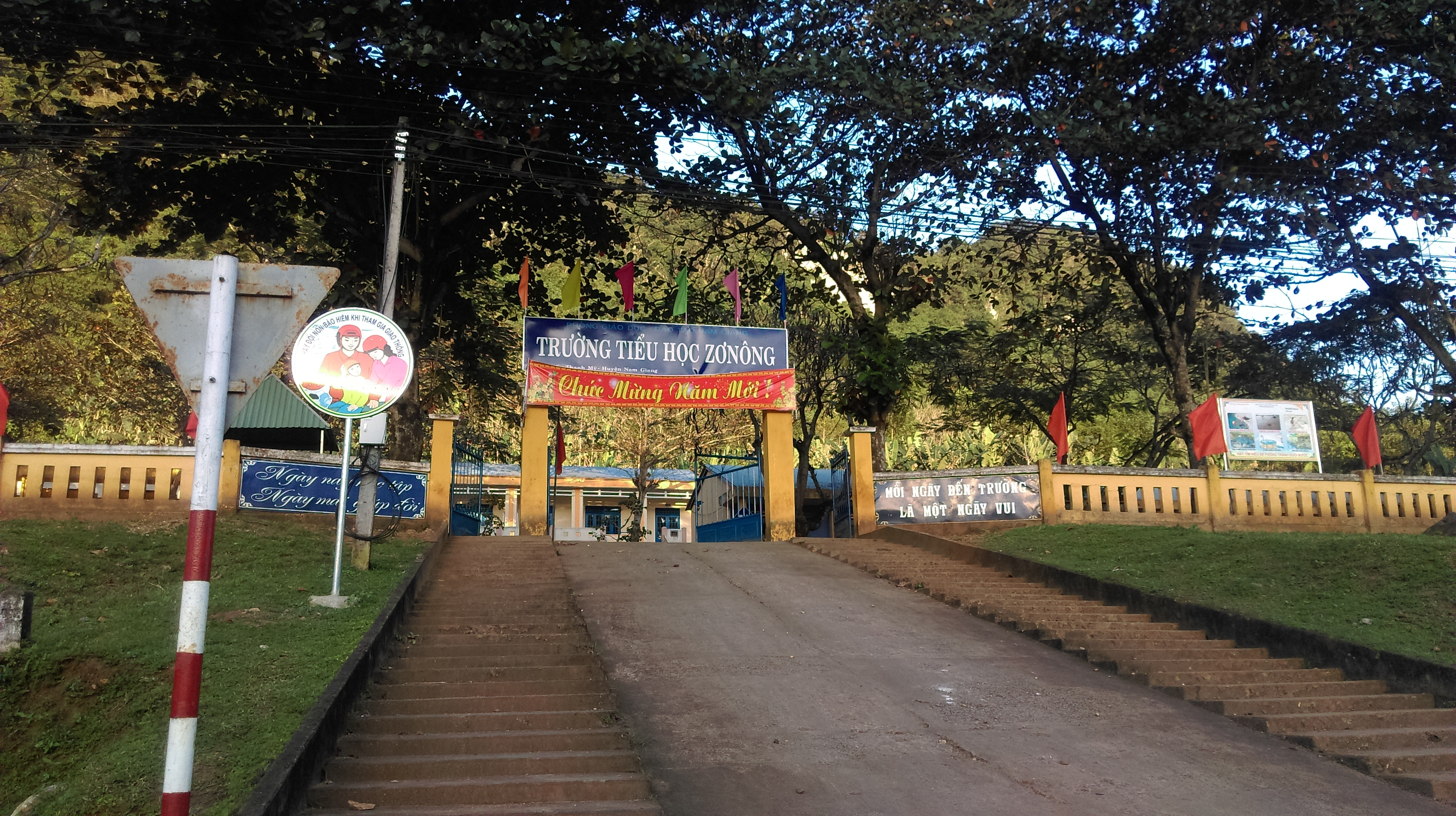
- Zo Nong Primary School

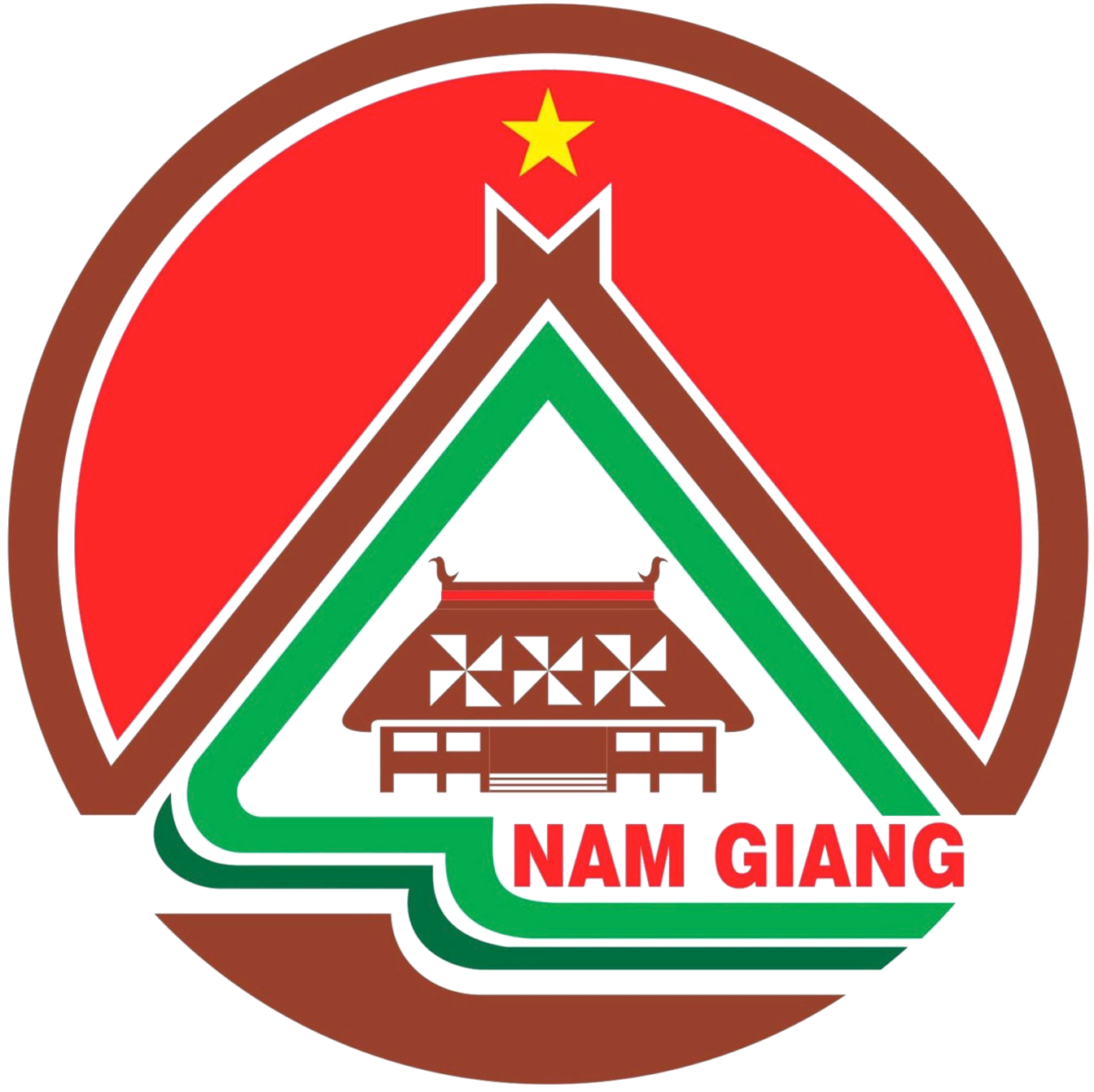
- Seal
- Interactive map of Nam Giang district
- Country: Vietnam
- Region: South Central Coast
- Province: Quảng Nam province
- Capital: Thạnh Mỹ

Area
  - Total: 732 sq mi (1,895 km^{2})

Population (2019 census)
  - Total: 26,123
  - Density: 35.70/sq mi (13.79/km^{2})
- Time zone: UTC+7 (Indochina Time)

Nam Giang is a former district (huyện) of Quảng Nam province in the South Central Coast region of Vietnam. As of 2019 the district had a population of 26,123. The district covers an area of 1,895 km^{2} (732 sq mi). The district capital lies at Thạnh Mỹ.
