= Hồng Giang =

Hồng Giang may refer to several places in Vietnam, including:

- Hồng Giang, a former rural commune of Lục Ngạn District, now part of Chũ, Bắc Ninh province
- Hồng Giang, Thái Bình, a rural commune of Đông Hưng District
