= Lâm Thao district =

Coordinates: 21°19′27″N 105°17′12″E

Lâm Thao district Huyện Lâm Thao
- District
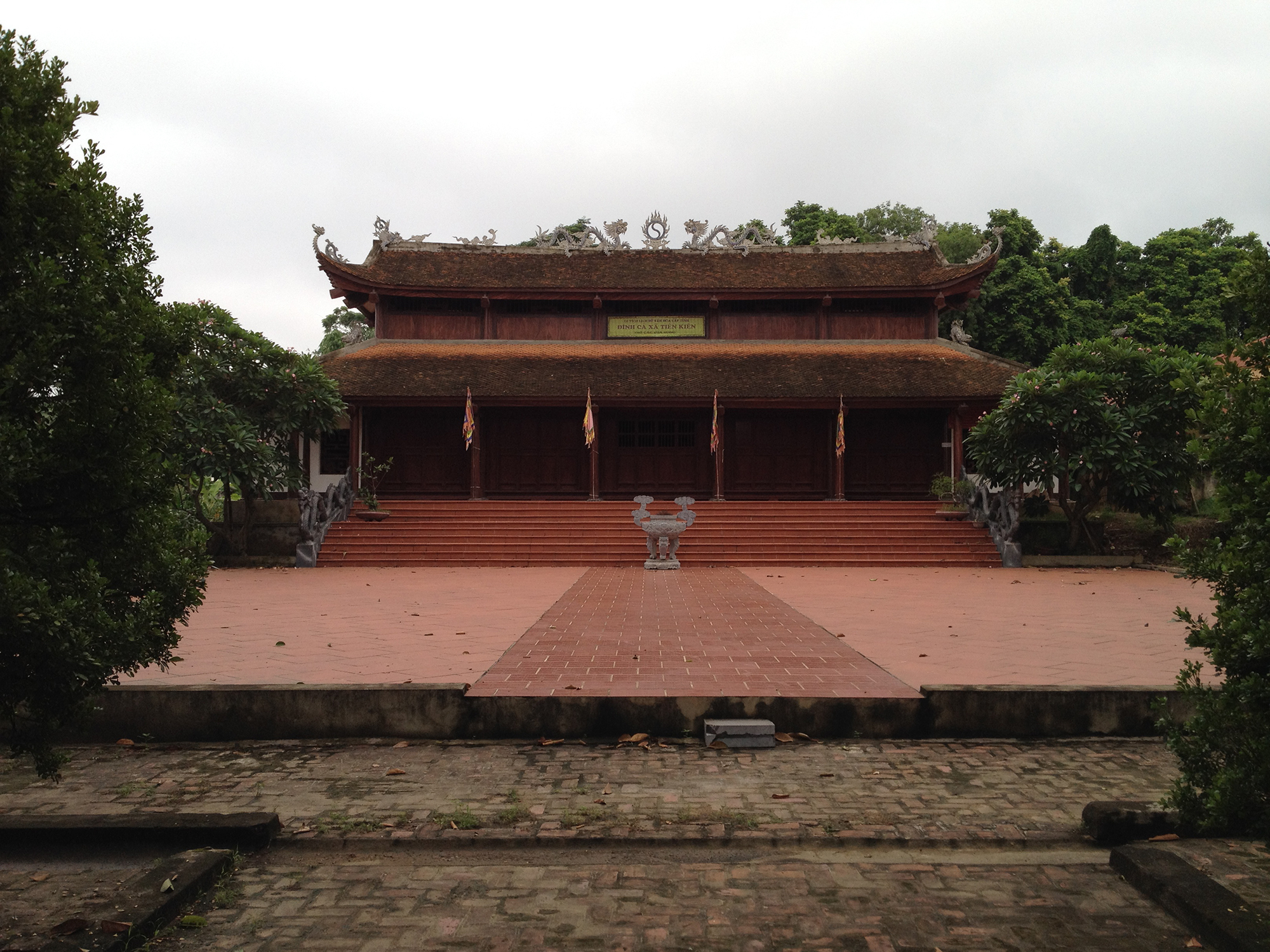
- Communal house in Tiên Kiên
- Interactive map of Lâm Thao district
- Country: Vietnam
- Region: Northeast
- Province: Phú Thọ
- Capital: Lâm Thao

Area
  - Total: 44 sq mi (115 km^{2})

Population (2003)
  - Total: 106,610
- Time zone: UTC+7 (Indochina Time)

Lâm Thao is a former rural district of Phú Thọ province in the Northeast region of Vietnam. As of 2003 the district had a population of 106,610. The district covers an area of 115 km^{2}. The district capital lies at Lâm Thao.

== Divisions ==
The district consists of two townships, Lâm Thao (also the district capital) and Hùng Sơn, and 12 communes: Xuân Huy, Thạch Sơn, Tiên Kiên, Sơn Vi, Hợp Hải, Kinh Kệ, Bản Nguyên, Vĩnh Lại, Tứ Xã, Sơn Dương, Xuân Lũng and Cao Xá.
