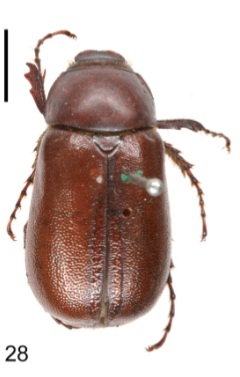

Scientific classification
- Kingdom: Animalia
- Phylum: Arthropoda
- Class: Insecta
- Order: Coleoptera
- Suborder: Polyphaga
- Infraorder: Scarabaeiformia
- Family: Scarabaeidae
- Genus: Miridiba
- Species: M. castanea

Binomial name
- Miridiba castanea (Waterhouse, 1875)

Synonyms
- Holotrichia castanea Waterhouse, 1875

= Miridiba castanea =

Species of beetle

Miridiba castanea is a species of beetle of the family Scarabaeidae. It is found in China (Beijing, Chongqing, Gansu, Liaoning, Shanxi, Sichuan), Japan (Honshu), the Russian Far East and South Korea.

== Description ==
Adults reach a length of about 18.5–22.5 mm. The dorsal surface is glabrous, the frons with inconspicuous short pubescence and some sparse long setae. The pronotum is glabrous, at most, with hardly visible, short setae in each puncture. The anterior margin has short and sparse setae. The elytra are glabrous with, at most, some sparse setae on basal margin and short setae in each puncture.
