= Trường Giang River =

River in Vietnam

Trường Giang
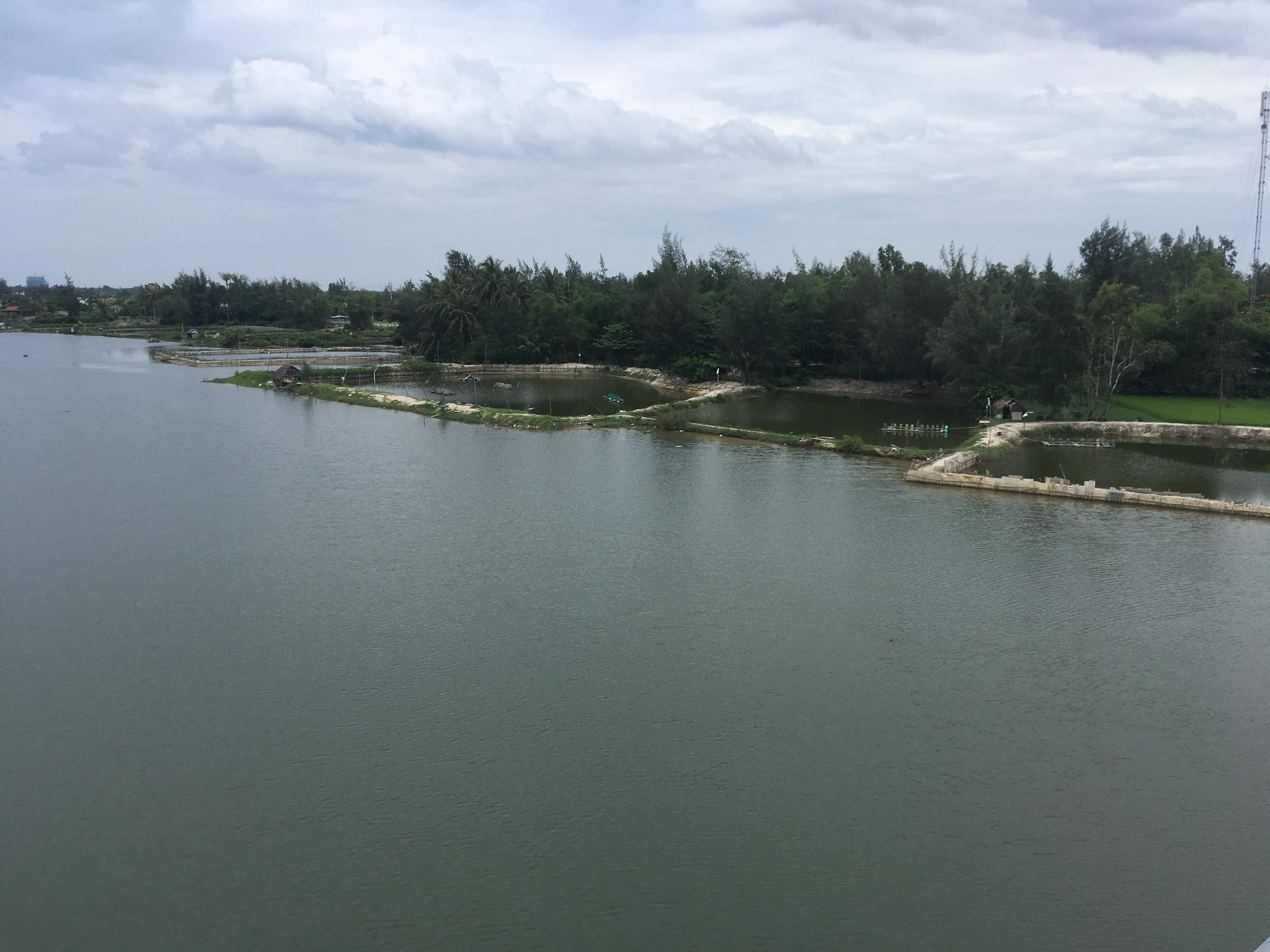
- Trường Giang River near its northern end, seen from Trường Giang bridge, Duy Nghĩa ward

Location
- Country: Vietnam
- Municipality: Da Nang

Physical characteristics
- Source: Thu Bồn River
  - location: Duy Nghĩa ward
  - coordinates: 15°51′19″N 108°21′20″E
- Mouth: South China Sea
  - location: Tam Hải ward
  - coordinates: 15°28′55″N 108°40′51″E
- Length: 67 km

The Trường Giang River (Vietnamese: sông Trường Giang) is a river in the municipality of Da Nang in central Vietnam. The river is approximately parallel to the sea coast, at a distance from 1 to 7 km. Its northern end is in the Thu Bồn River just south of Hội An; its southern end is in An Hòa Bay.

During the dry season, the river is dominated by the tides. During high tide, water flows into the river from both ends to meet in the middle. During low tide, water flows back out of both ends. Due to its lack of well-defined flow direction, it has been described as having “neither beginning nor end, neither upstream nor downstream direction, neither right nor left bank”. The local population calls it “the river that flows crosswise” (Vietnamese: con sông chảy ngang).

The river is brackish and sea animals (like mullet, barracuda, and jellyfish) can live in its waters. The local population catch those with lift nets, but productivity is going down due to pollution. Many also cultivate shrimp in ponds carved out of the river.

== History ==
Researchers believe that the Trường Giang River originated from tidal creeks, which turned into a lagoon, to eventually form the river as it is today.

In the time of the Nguyễn lords (17th and 18th century), the river was the main waterway for small watercraft transporting goods between Hội An and the regions south from it, thanks to the gentle currents in the river.

When prices of whiteleg shrimp went up in 2013, many farmers created shrimp ponds in the river. The wastewater from many of these ponds is discharged into the river, creating a huge pollution problem. In 2024, the provincial authorities of Quảng Nam (now subsumed into the municipality of Da Nang) greenlighted a project to dredge the riverbed and to build embankments and a floodwater drainage system, which was expected to ease environmental pollution.
