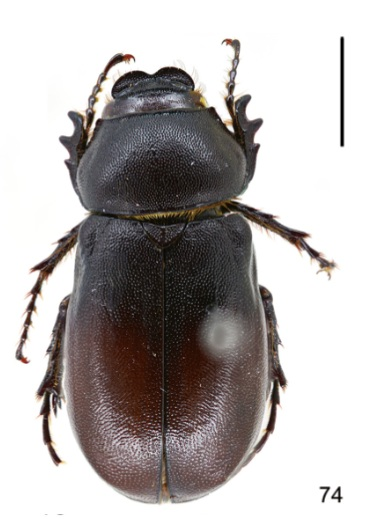

Scientific classification
- Kingdom: Animalia
- Phylum: Arthropoda
- Clade: Pancrustacea
- Class: Insecta
- Order: Coleoptera
- Suborder: Polyphaga
- Infraorder: Scarabaeiformia
- Family: Scarabaeidae
- Genus: Miridiba
- Species: M. saigonensis

Binomial name
- Miridiba saigonensis (Moser, 1912)

Synonyms
- Holotrichia saigonensis Moser, 1912

= Miridiba saigonensis =

Species of beetle

Miridiba saigonensis is a species of beetle of the family Scarabaeidae. It is found in Vietnam.

== Description ==
Adults reach a length of about 22–25 mm. The pronotal surface has strong and deep punctures, each one with a tiny, hardly visible bulge. The scutellum is without punctures at the middle line. The elytral surface has regularly distributed punctures, each one with a tiny, hardly visible bulge.
