= Tam Giang, Cà Mau =

Coordinates: 8°48′N 105°11′E

Tam Giang
- Commune and village
- Interactive map of Tam Giang
- Country: Vietnam
- Province: Cà Mau
- Time zone: UTC+07:00

Tam Giang is a commune (xã) and village in Cà Mau province, in Vietnam.

The Standing Committee of the National Assembly issued Resolution No. 1655/NQ-UBTVQH15 on the rearrangement of commune-level administrative units of Cà Mau Province in 2025 (the resolution takes effect from 16 June 2025). Accordingly, Tam Giang Commune was established in Cà Mau Province on the basis of the entire natural area of 36.60 km^{2} and a population of 7,707 people of Hiệp Tùng Commune; the entire natural area of 101.70 km^{2} and a population of 9,167 people of Tam Giang Commune; and the entire natural area of 66.90 km^{2} and a population of 6,403 people of Tam Giang Đông Commune, all belonging to Năm Căn District.
