= Tây Giang district =

Coordinates: 15°53′N 107°30′E

Tây Giang district Huyện Tây Giang
- District
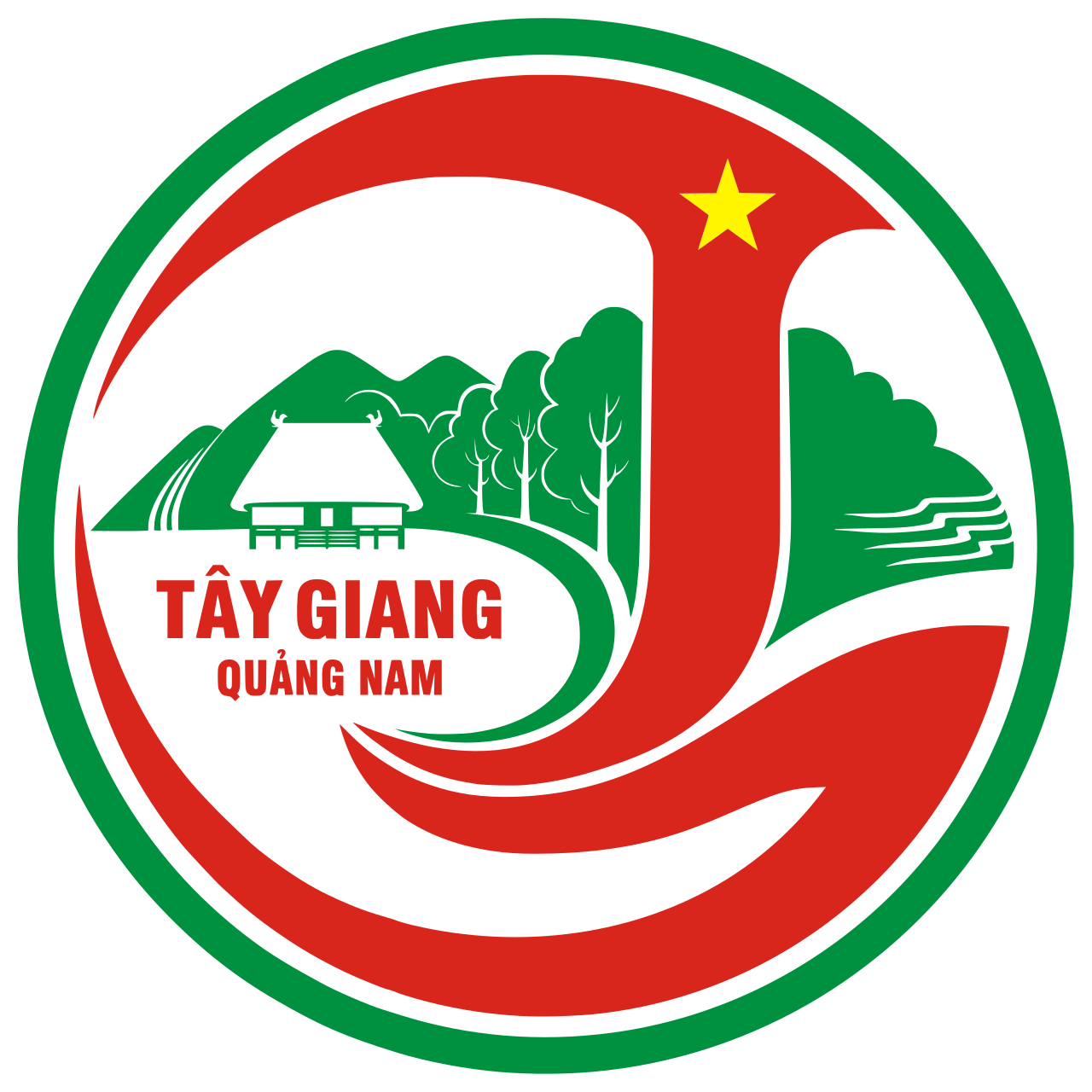
- Seal
- Interactive map of Tây Giang district
- Country: Vietnam
- Region: South Central Coast
- Province: Quảng Nam province
- Capital: A Tiêng

Area
  - Total: 348 sq mi (901 km^{2})

Population (2003)
  - Total: 15,950
- Time zone: UTC+7 (Indochina Time)

Tây Giang is a former rural district (huyện) of Quảng Nam province in the South Central Coast region of Vietnam. As of 2003 the district had a population of 13,926. The district covers an area of 901 km^{2} (348 sq mi). The district capital lies at A Tiêng.
