= Hilyotrogus assamensis =

Scientific classification
- Kingdom: Animalia
- Phylum: Arthropoda
- Clade: Pancrustacea
- Class: Insecta
- Order: Coleoptera
- Suborder: Polyphaga
- Infraorder: Scarabaeiformia
- Family: Scarabaeidae
- Genus: Hilyotrogus
- Species: H. assamensis

Binomial name
- Hilyotrogus assamensis Moser, 1913

Species of beetle

Hilyotrogus assamensis is a species of beetle of the family Scarabaeidae. It is found in India (Sikkim, Assam).

== Description ==
Adults reach a length of about 13 mm (0.51 in). They are similar to Hilyotrogus sikkimensis, but smaller. The frons is strongly but widely punctate, the punctures are long and erect. The punctation of the clypeus is slightly closer, the upturned anterior margin is not emarginate. The antennae are yellow. The pronotum is somewhat longer than in sikkimensis, its anterior angles are slightly projecting. The surface is sparsely and finely punctate, the anterior margin and lateral margins are fringed with long yellow cilia. The scutellum is smooth. The elytra are widely punctate on the disc, more closely punctate on the sides, only the first two primary ribs are clearly marked and bear scattered punctures. The pygidium is widely covered with large but flat punctures. The chest is covered in yellow hair, and the abdomen is finely and widely punctured.
