= Hilyotrogus rufosericeus =

Scientific classification
- Kingdom: Animalia
- Phylum: Arthropoda
- Clade: Pancrustacea
- Class: Insecta
- Order: Coleoptera
- Suborder: Polyphaga
- Infraorder: Scarabaeiformia
- Family: Scarabaeidae
- Genus: Hilyotrogus
- Species: H. rufosericeus

Binomial name
- Hilyotrogus rufosericeus Moser, 1913

Species of beetle

Hilyotrogus rufosericeus is a species of beetle of the family Scarabaeidae. It is found in India (Assam).

== Description ==
Adults reach a length of about 17 mm (0.67 in). They are similar to Hilyotrogus ochraceosericeus, but has a different antennal structure. The clypeus is strongly tapered anteriorly, its anterior margin upturned but not emarginate. The sides of the pronotum are somewhat more strongly arched than in ochraceosericeus, and the pygidium is somewhat longer than in the latter species. Otherwise, the two species are nearly identical.
