= Heptophyllini =

Scientific classification
- Kingdom: Animalia
- Phylum: Arthropoda
- Clade: Pancrustacea
- Class: Insecta
- Order: Coleoptera
- Suborder: Polyphaga
- Infraorder: Scarabaeiformia
- Family: Scarabaeidae
- Subfamily: Melolonthinae
- Tribe: Heptophyllini; Medvedev, 1951

Tribe of beetles

Heptophyllini is a tribe of scarab beetles in the family Scarabaeidae.

== Taxonomy ==
The tribe Heptophyllini is one of the insufficiently known and also poorly defined groups of the Old World Melolonthinae. The tribe was proposed by Medvedev to accommodate four genera (Heptophylla, Hexataenius, Hilyotrogus and Toxospathius). Medvedev argued out that Heptophyllini occupies a certain intermediate position between the tribes Melolonthini and Rhizotrogini. However, this opinion was weakly supported by morphological data. Kalinina examined the larval stages of Hilyotrogus bicoloreus in detail and found no differences from the larvae of Rhizotrogini, but retained Heptophyllini as a valid tribe. Although weakly supported, the tribe Heptophyllini has been considered valid in the last 50 years. Two additional genera (Laotrichia and Taiwanotrichia), were described, and the total number of taxa assigned to Heptophyllini now exceeds 50.

== Genera ==
The following genera are recognised in the tribe Heptophyllini:

- Heptophylla Motschulsky, 1857
- Hexataenius Fairmaire, 1891
- Hilyotrogus Fairmaire, 1886
- Laotrichia Keith, 2007
- Taiwanotrichia Kobayashi, 1990
- Toxospathius Fairmaire, 1878
