= Monotropus marquezi =

Scientific classification
- Kingdom: Animalia
- Phylum: Arthropoda
- Clade: Pancrustacea
- Class: Insecta
- Order: Coleoptera
- Suborder: Polyphaga
- Infraorder: Scarabaeiformia
- Family: Scarabaeidae
- Genus: Monotropus
- Species: M. marquezi

Binomial name
- Monotropus marquezi López-Colón, 1986

Synonyms
- Monotropus brancoi marquezi López-Colón, 1986

Species of beetle

Monotropus marquezi is a species of beetle of the family Scarabaeidae. It is found in Spain.

== Description ==
Adults reach a length of about 11.7 mm (0.46 in). They are similar to Monotropus brancoi, but may be distinguished by the yellowish area at the anterior angles of the pronotum (which is otherwise chestnut-brown). The pronotal punctation is less dense, especially towards the anterior angles and the sides are slightly sinuate in the posterior half. The elytral punctation is also less dense, with few transverse wrinkles. The basal tooth of the fore tibiae is much smaller than the other two and almost perpendicular to the tibia, barely directed forward. The hind femur has finer and less dense punctation on the ventral surface, especially in the basal half.
