= Maghrebotrogus subparallelus =

Scientific classification
- Kingdom: Animalia
- Phylum: Arthropoda
- Clade: Pancrustacea
- Class: Insecta
- Order: Coleoptera
- Suborder: Polyphaga
- Infraorder: Scarabaeiformia
- Family: Scarabaeidae
- Genus: Maghrebotrogus
- Species: M. subparallelus

Binomial name
- Maghrebotrogus subparallelus (Escalera, 1913)

Synonyms
- Rhizotrogus subparallelus Escalera, 1913

Species of beetle

Maghrebotrogus subparallelus is a species of beetle of the family Scarabaeidae. It is found in Morocco.

== Description ==
Adults reach a length of about 10–11 mm (0.39–0.43 in). They are brownish-yellow to light reddish-brown. The head, pronotum and scutellum are glabrous, while the elytra have very short hairs.
