= Maghrebotrogus zinae =

Scientific classification
- Kingdom: Animalia
- Phylum: Arthropoda
- Clade: Pancrustacea
- Class: Insecta
- Order: Coleoptera
- Suborder: Polyphaga
- Infraorder: Scarabaeiformia
- Family: Scarabaeidae
- Genus: Maghrebotrogus
- Species: M. zinae

Binomial name
- Maghrebotrogus zinae Montreuil & Keith, 2022

Species of beetle

Maghrebotrogus zinae is a species of beetle of the family Scarabaeidae. It is found in Algeria and Tunisia.

== Description ==
Adults reach a length of about 11–12 mm (0.43–0.47 in). They are brownish-yellow, but sometimes with a light reddish-brown pronotum or even entirely light reddish-brown. The head, pronotum and scutellum are glabrous. The elytra have very short hairs.

== Etymology ==
This species is dedicated to Zina Nasr, a student at the Faculty of Sciences in Tunis, who collected it in Tunisia.
