= Maghrebotrogus cristatifrons =

Scientific classification
- Kingdom: Animalia
- Phylum: Arthropoda
- Clade: Pancrustacea
- Class: Insecta
- Order: Coleoptera
- Suborder: Polyphaga
- Infraorder: Scarabaeiformia
- Family: Scarabaeidae
- Genus: Maghrebotrogus
- Species: M. cristatifrons

Binomial name
- Maghrebotrogus cristatifrons (Fairmaire, 1883)

Synonyms
- Rhizotrogus cristatifrons Fairmaire, 1883

Species of beetle

Maghrebotrogus cristatifrons is a species of beetle of the family Scarabaeidae. It is found in Tunisia.

== Description ==
Adults reach a length of about 10–13 mm (0.39–0.51 in). They are reddish-brown. The head, pronotum and scutellum are glabrous, while the elytra have very short hairs.
