= Eotrichia costipennis =

Scientific classification
- Kingdom: Animalia
- Phylum: Arthropoda
- Clade: Pancrustacea
- Class: Insecta
- Order: Coleoptera
- Suborder: Polyphaga
- Infraorder: Scarabaeiformia
- Family: Scarabaeidae
- Genus: Eotrichia
- Species: E. costipennis

Binomial name
- Eotrichia costipennis (Moser, 1912)

Synonyms
- Holotrichia costipennis Moser, 1912

Species of beetle

Eotrichia costipennis is a species of beetle of the family Scarabaeidae. It is found in China.

== Description ==
Adults reach a length of about 25 mm (0.98 in). They are dark blackish-brown. The upper surface is almost dull, with a silky sheen, while the underside is faintly glossy, and the femora and tarsi are reddish-brown. The head is strongly wrinkled and punctured and the antennae are brown. The pronotum is more than twice as wide as it is long, its sides are arched and widened in the middle, and not crenate. The anterior and posterior angles are obtuse. The upper surface, with the exception of a narrow, smooth medial line, is covered with umbilical punctures, which are densely packed and deep along the lateral margins and in front of the posterior margin, giving the pronotum a wrinkled appearance near the lateral margins. The punctures bear extremely minute setae. The elytra have widely spaced punctures, somewhat denser at the sides, and the spaces between them are weakly wrinkled. The pygidium is moderately densely covered with umbilical punctures, which are short-set. The thorax is covered with long, yellow hairs and the abdomen is finely and sparsely punctured in the anterior part, and somewhat more strongly and coarsely punctured in the posterior part.
