= Megistophylla sumatrana =

Scientific classification
- Kingdom: Animalia
- Phylum: Arthropoda
- Clade: Pancrustacea
- Class: Insecta
- Order: Coleoptera
- Suborder: Polyphaga
- Infraorder: Scarabaeiformia
- Family: Scarabaeidae
- Genus: Megistophylla
- Species: M. sumatrana

Binomial name
- Megistophylla sumatrana Moser, 1913

Species of beetle

Megistophylla sumatrana is a species of beetle of the family Scarabaeidae. It is found in Indonesia (Sumatra).

== Description ==
Adults reach a length of about 18 mm (0.71 in). They are similar to Megistophylla junghuhni, but significantly smaller. The colouration is chestnut brown, with the head and pronotum slightly darker. The head is coarsely, weakly wrinkled-punctate, the anterior margin of the clypeus is only slightly but distinctly emarginate, the vertex is indistinctly keeled. The pronotum is coarsely and much more densely punctate than in junghuhni, the lateral margins are only very weakly serrated. The scutellum bears only a few punctures. The elytra are moderately densely covered with strong umbilical punctures and ribs are absent except for the sutural rib. The punctation of the pygidium is irregular and sparse. The chest is covered in golden-yellow hair, the abdomen smooth in the middle, widely dotted with umbilical markings along the sides.
