= Hilyotrogus setipennis =

Scientific classification
- Kingdom: Animalia
- Phylum: Arthropoda
- Clade: Pancrustacea
- Class: Insecta
- Order: Coleoptera
- Suborder: Polyphaga
- Infraorder: Scarabaeiformia
- Family: Scarabaeidae
- Genus: Hilyotrogus
- Species: H. setipennis

Binomial name
- Hilyotrogus setipennis Moser, 1913

Species of beetle

Hilyotrogus setipennis is a species of beetle of the family Scarabaeidae. It is found in China.

== Description ==
Adults reach a length of about 18 mm (0.71 in). They may be distinguished by the pubescence and setae on the upper surface. The colouration is reddish-brown, with the head and pronotum somewhat darker. The head is rather densely punctate and covered with yellow hairs. The punctation of the pronotum is moderately dense, each puncture bearing a protruding yellow hair. The scutellum, elytra, and pygidium are punctate a little more sparsely than the pronotum and the short hairs of the punctures are bristle-like. The thorax is densely covered with yellow hairs, the abdomen finely and sparsely punctate, each puncture equally bearing a small bristle.
