= Hilyotrogus piceosericeus =

Scientific classification
- Kingdom: Animalia
- Phylum: Arthropoda
- Clade: Pancrustacea
- Class: Insecta
- Order: Coleoptera
- Suborder: Polyphaga
- Infraorder: Scarabaeiformia
- Family: Scarabaeidae
- Genus: Hilyotrogus
- Species: H. piceosericeus

Binomial name
- Hilyotrogus piceosericeus Moser, 1913

Species of beetle

Hilyotrogus piceosericeus is a species of beetle of the family Scarabaeidae. It is found in China (Yunnan).

== Description ==
Adults reach a length of about 16–18 mm (0.63–0.71 in). They are blackish-brown or blackish and somewhat iridescent. The frons is widely punctate, and the punctures bear erect yellow hairs. The punctation of the clypeus is slightly denser and its anterior margin is upturned and weakly emarginate. The punctation of the pronotum is moderately dense, and the punctures, like those of the elytra, bear tiny setae. The lateral margins of the pronotum are sparsely pubescent, crenate, and slightly upturned at the anterior angles. They, like the anterior margin, are fringed with yellow cilia. The scutellum is finely, more or less densely, punctate. On the elytra, the weakly protruding ribs bear only scattered punctures and the intervals are widely spaced, and the sides of the elytra are somewhat more densely punctate. The pygidium is sparsely or moderately densely covered with eye punctures. The thorax bears a dense yellow punctation and the abdomen is very widely and finely punctate, and the punctures are short-bristled.
