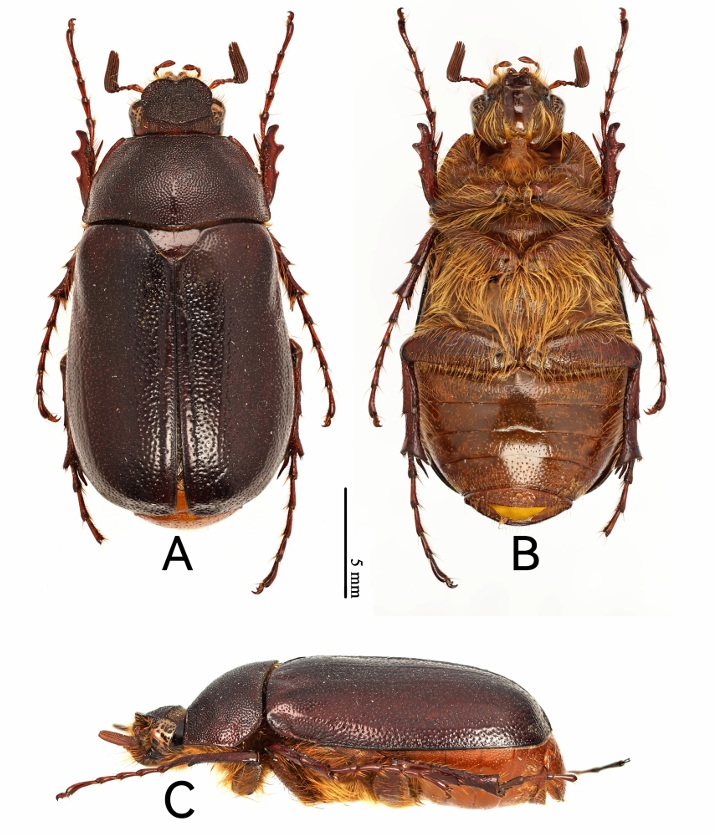

Scientific classification
- Kingdom: Animalia
- Phylum: Arthropoda
- Clade: Pancrustacea
- Class: Insecta
- Order: Coleoptera
- Suborder: Polyphaga
- Infraorder: Scarabaeiformia
- Family: Scarabaeidae
- Genus: Megistophylla
- Species: M. chinensis

Binomial name
- Megistophylla chinensis Zhang & Li, 2025

= Megistophylla chinensis =

Species of beetle

Megistophylla chinensis is a species of beetle of the Scarabaeidae family. This species is found in China (Yunnan).

Adults reach a length of about 19.8 mm. They have a dark blackish-brown body.

== Etymology ==
The species is named after its country of origin.
