= Hilyotrogus pilicollis =

Scientific classification
- Kingdom: Animalia
- Phylum: Arthropoda
- Clade: Pancrustacea
- Class: Insecta
- Order: Coleoptera
- Suborder: Polyphaga
- Infraorder: Scarabaeiformia
- Family: Scarabaeidae
- Genus: Hilyotrogus
- Species: H. pilicollis

Binomial name
- Hilyotrogus pilicollis Moser, 1913

Species of beetle

Hilyotrogus pilicollis is a species of beetle of the family Scarabaeidae. It is found in China (Yunnan).

== Description ==
Adults reach a length of about 15 mm (0.59 in). They are similar to Hilyotrogus holosericeus, but may be distinguished by the pubescence of the pronotum. The frons is extensively coarsely punctate, each puncture bearing erect yellow hairs. The punctation of the clypeus is somewhat denser, its anterior margin is upturned. The pronotum is moderately densely punctate and covered with yellow hairs. The scutellum bears fine and widely spaced punctation. On the elytral disc, the punctures are fairly widely spaced, becoming closer together laterally. They bear minute setae. The pygidium is somewhat longitudinally wrinkled. The thorax is densely covered with yellow hairs, the abdomen only very finely and widely punctate, each puncture bearing a small yellow bristle-like hair.
