= Amphitrichia angulicalcarata =

Scientific classification
- Kingdom: Animalia
- Phylum: Arthropoda
- Clade: Pancrustacea
- Class: Insecta
- Order: Coleoptera
- Suborder: Polyphaga
- Infraorder: Scarabaeiformia
- Family: Scarabaeidae
- Genus: Amphitrichia
- Species: A. angulicalcarata

Binomial name
- Amphitrichia angulicalcarata (Itoh, 2003)

Synonyms
- Holotrichia angulicalcarata Itoh, 2003

Species of beetle

Amphitrichia angulicalcarata is a species of beetle of the family Scarabaeidae. It is found in the Philippines (Mindoro, Palawan).

== Description ==
Adults reach a length of about 24.3–28.6 mm (0.96–1.13 in). They have an elongate body, with the head, pronotum and scutellum dark brown, and the antennae, elytra, and legs lighter brown. The propygidium, pygidium and abdomen are much paler, light brown. The dorsal and ventral surfaces are opaque, the former weakly iridescent. The legs are shining.
