= Maghrebotrogus julieni =

Scientific classification
- Kingdom: Animalia
- Phylum: Arthropoda
- Clade: Pancrustacea
- Class: Insecta
- Order: Coleoptera
- Suborder: Polyphaga
- Infraorder: Scarabaeiformia
- Family: Scarabaeidae
- Genus: Maghrebotrogus
- Species: M. julieni

Binomial name
- Maghrebotrogus julieni (Baraud, 1972)

Synonyms
- Rhizotrogus (Amodotrogus) julieni Baraud, 1972

Species of beetle

Maghrebotrogus julieni is a species of beetle of the family Scarabaeidae. It is found in Morocco.

== Description ==
Adults reach a length of about 11–14.5 mm (0.43–0.57 in). They are brownish-yellow to more or less dark reddish-brown, with the pronotum sometimes slightly darker. The head, pronotum and scutellum are glabrous, while the elytra have very short hairs.
