= Maghrebotrogus marginiceps =

Scientific classification
- Kingdom: Animalia
- Phylum: Arthropoda
- Clade: Pancrustacea
- Class: Insecta
- Order: Coleoptera
- Suborder: Polyphaga
- Infraorder: Scarabaeiformia
- Family: Scarabaeidae
- Genus: Maghrebotrogus
- Species: M. marginiceps

Binomial name
- Maghrebotrogus marginiceps (Fairmaire, 1866)

Synonyms
- Rhizotrogus marginiceps Fairmaire, 1866

Species of beetle

Maghrebotrogus marginiceps is a species of beetle of the family Scarabaeidae. It is found in Algeria.

== Description ==
Adults reach a length of about 11–12 mm (0.43–0.47 in). They have a narrow, reddish-brown body. The head, pronotum and scutellum are glabrous, while the elytra have very short hairs.
