= Amphitrichia mindoroensis =

Scientific classification
- Kingdom: Animalia
- Phylum: Arthropoda
- Clade: Pancrustacea
- Class: Insecta
- Order: Coleoptera
- Suborder: Polyphaga
- Infraorder: Scarabaeiformia
- Family: Scarabaeidae
- Genus: Amphitrichia
- Species: A. mindoroensis

Binomial name
- Amphitrichia mindoroensis (Matsumoto, 2010)

Synonyms
- Holotrichia mindoroensis Matsumoto, 2010

Species of beetle

Amphitrichia mindoroensis is a species of beetle of the family Scarabaeidae. It is found in the Philippines (Luzon, Mindoro, Palawan).

== Description ==
Adults reach a length of about 12–15.5 mm (0.47–0.61 in). They have an elongate oval body, with the head blackish, the pronotum and prosternum dark reddish brown and the elytra and meso- and metasterna pale to dark brown. The abdomen and pygidium are yellowish brown. The dorsal surface is weakly shining.

== Etymology ==
The species was named after one of the localities where it was found, Mindoro.
