= Eremotrogus =

Scientific classification
- Kingdom: Animalia
- Phylum: Arthropoda
- Clade: Pancrustacea
- Class: Insecta
- Order: Coleoptera
- Suborder: Polyphaga
- Infraorder: Scarabaeiformia
- Family: Scarabaeidae
- Subfamily: Melolonthinae
- Tribe: Rhizotrogini
- Genus: Eremotrogus; Kolbe, 1914
- Species: E. pruinosus

Binomial name
- Eremotrogus pruinosus Kolbe, 1914

Genus of beetles

Eremotrogus is a genus of beetle of the family Scarabaeidae. It is monotypic, being represented by the single species, Eremotrogus pruinosus, which is found in Tanzania.

== Description ==
Adults reach a length of about 19 mm (0.75 in). They are dull brown and pruinose. The pygidium is glossy and glabrous. The underside is brownish-yellow, with short, fine yellow hairs. The legs are brown.
