= Bunbunius =

Scientific classification
- Kingdom: Animalia
- Phylum: Arthropoda
- Clade: Pancrustacea
- Class: Insecta
- Order: Coleoptera
- Suborder: Polyphaga
- Infraorder: Scarabaeiformia
- Family: Scarabaeidae
- Subfamily: Melolonthinae
- Tribe: Rhizotrogini
- Genus: Bunbunius; Nomura, 1970

Genus of leaf beetles

Bunbunius is a genus of beetles belonging to the family Scarabaeidae.

== Species ==
- Bunbunius abditus Keith, 2008
- Bunbunius bicallosifrons (Frey, 1972)
- Bunbunius csorbai Keith, 2008
- Bunbunius diversifrons (Fairmaire, 1891)
- Bunbunius gamdoensis Keith & Li, 2013
- Bunbunius hangayi Keith, 2008
- Bunbunius hartmanni Keith, 2009
- Bunbunius liukueiensis (Kobayashi, 1985)
- Bunbunius myanmaricus Keith, 2024
- Bunbunius opacipennis (Nomura, 1970)
- Bunbunius privus Keith, 2005
- Bunbunius prunellus (Arrow, 1946)
- Bunbunius pseudoopacipennis Keith, 2008
- Bunbunius puchneri Keith, 2008
- Bunbunius quadrihamis Sehnal, 2013
- Bunbunius reticulatus (Murayama, 1941)
- Bunbunius rozneri Keith, 2008
- Bunbunius sinensis Keith, 2005
- Bunbunius techongi Keith & Li, 2012
- Bunbunius turnai Keith, 2008
- Bunbunius vietnamicus Keith, 2022
