= Maghrebotrogus scutellaris =

Scientific classification
- Kingdom: Animalia
- Phylum: Arthropoda
- Clade: Pancrustacea
- Class: Insecta
- Order: Coleoptera
- Suborder: Polyphaga
- Infraorder: Scarabaeiformia
- Family: Scarabaeidae
- Genus: Maghrebotrogus
- Species: M. scutellaris

Binomial name
- Maghrebotrogus scutellaris (Lucas, 1846)

Synonyms
- Rhizotrogus scutellaris Lucas, 1846; Rhizotrogus (Amphimallus) lobatus Fairmaire, 1860

Species of beetle

Maghrebotrogus scutellaris is a species of beetle of the family Scarabaeidae. It is found in France, Algeria and Tunisia.

== Description ==
Adults reach a length of about 11–14 mm (0.43–0.55 in). They are brownish-yellow to reddish-brown, with the disc of the pronotum sometimes darkened. The head, pronotum and scutellum are glabrous. The elytra are dull and have a pruinose appearance, as well as very short hairs.
