= Maghrebotrogus altifrons =

Scientific classification
- Kingdom: Animalia
- Phylum: Arthropoda
- Clade: Pancrustacea
- Class: Insecta
- Order: Coleoptera
- Suborder: Polyphaga
- Infraorder: Scarabaeiformia
- Family: Scarabaeidae
- Genus: Maghrebotrogus
- Species: M. altifrons

Binomial name
- Maghrebotrogus altifrons (Baraud, 1971)

Synonyms
- Rhizotrogus (Amphimallon) altifrons Baraud, 1971

Species of beetle

Maghrebotrogus altifrons is a species of beetle of the family Scarabaeidae. It is found in Morocco.

== Description ==
Adults reach a length of about 11–14 mm (0.43–0.55 in). They are brownish-yellow to brownish-red. The head, pronotum and scutellum are glabrous, while the elytra have very short hairs.
