= Amphitrichia sulana =

Scientific classification
- Kingdom: Animalia
- Phylum: Arthropoda
- Clade: Pancrustacea
- Class: Insecta
- Order: Coleoptera
- Suborder: Polyphaga
- Infraorder: Scarabaeiformia
- Family: Scarabaeidae
- Genus: Amphitrichia
- Species: A. sulana

Binomial name
- Amphitrichia sulana (Moser, 1912)

Synonyms
- Holotrichia sulana Moser, 1912

Species of beetle

Amphitrichia sulana is a species of beetle of the family Scarabaeidae. It is found in Indonesia (Sula Islands).

== Description ==
Adults reach a length of about 17 mm (0.67 in). The upper surface is blackish-brown and pruinose. The pronotum is punctate and the sides are arched and widened in the middle, tapering somewhat more strongly posteriorly than anteriorly. The posterior angles are very blunt and shortly rounded. The scutellum bears a few fine punctures. The elytra are moderately densely punctate, with the punctures being more widely spaced on the distinctly prominent ribs. The pygidium is yellow with scattered punctures. The underside is brown and the abdomen is yellow. The thorax is covered with greyish-yellow pubescence.
