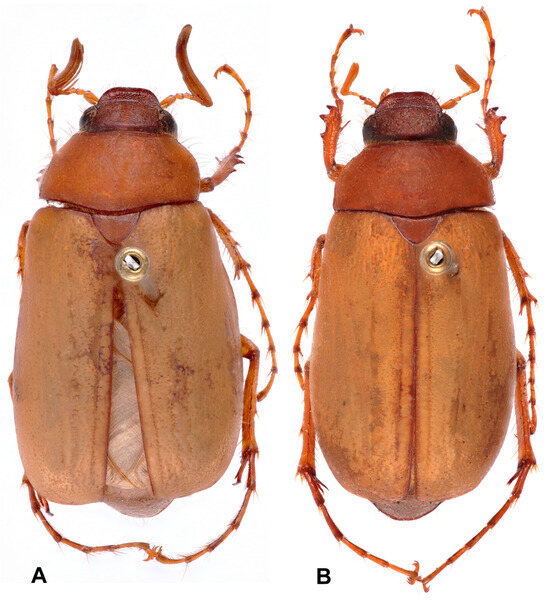

Scientific classification
- Kingdom: Animalia
- Phylum: Arthropoda
- Clade: Pancrustacea
- Class: Insecta
- Order: Coleoptera
- Suborder: Polyphaga
- Infraorder: Scarabaeiformia
- Family: Scarabaeidae
- Genus: Heptophylla
- Species: H. calcarata

Binomial name
- Heptophylla calcarata Zhang, 1981

= Heptophylla calcarata =

Species of beetle

Heptophylla calcarata is a species of beetle of the family Scarabaeidae. It is found in China (Xizang).
