= Monotropus =

Scientific classification
- Kingdom: Animalia
- Phylum: Arthropoda
- Clade: Pancrustacea
- Class: Insecta
- Order: Coleoptera
- Suborder: Polyphaga
- Infraorder: Scarabaeiformia
- Family: Scarabaeidae
- Subfamily: Melolonthinae
- Tribe: Rhizotrogini
- Genus: Monotropus; Erichson, 1847

Synonyms
- Paramonotropus Medvedev, 1951

Genus of beetles

6. Monotropus fausti

Monotropus is a genus of beetles belonging to the family Scarabaeidae.

== Species ==
- Monotropus beauprei (Pic, 1906)
- Monotropus brancoi Baraud, 1979
- Monotropus fausti Semenov, 1898
- Monotropus hirticollis (Lucas, 1846)
- Monotropus humilis (Marseul, 1878)
- Monotropus laticollis (Perez-Arcas, 1874)
- Monotropus lusitanicus Baraud, 1976
- Monotropus marquezi López-Colón, 1986
- Monotropus nordmanni Blanchard, 1851
- Monotropus rotroui (Peyerimhoff, 1931)
- Monotropus staudingeri (Schaufuss, 1861)
