= Amphitrichia moana =

Scientific classification
- Kingdom: Animalia
- Phylum: Arthropoda
- Clade: Pancrustacea
- Class: Insecta
- Order: Coleoptera
- Suborder: Polyphaga
- Infraorder: Scarabaeiformia
- Family: Scarabaeidae
- Genus: Amphitrichia
- Species: A. moana

Binomial name
- Amphitrichia moana (Moser, 1912)

Synonyms
- Holotrichia moana Moser, 1912

Species of beetle

Amphitrichia moana is a species of beetle of the family Scarabaeidae. It is found in Indonesia (Moa).

== Description ==
Adults reach a length of about 20 mm (0.79 in). They are brown and shiny, with the elytra, pygidium and abdomen yellow. The head is coarsely and densely punctate, weakly impressed in the middle behind the clypeus suture. The antennae are brown with a yellowish club. The pronotum is not very densely covered with coarse punctures, strongly arched behind the middle. The lateral margins are emarginate before the middle, and the anterior angles are not upturned, but rather short and rounded. The scutellum is punctate except for a smooth midline. The elytra are coarsely punctate, the ribs weakly raised, and the punctures on them more widely spaced. The pygidium is weakly convex and rather sparsely punctate. The chest is covered with yellowish hairs, the abdomen extensively covered with needle-like punctures bearing yellow setae. The center of the abdomen is glossy, the sides dull.
