= Amphitrichia =

Scientific classification
- Kingdom: Animalia
- Phylum: Arthropoda
- Clade: Pancrustacea
- Class: Insecta
- Order: Coleoptera
- Suborder: Polyphaga
- Infraorder: Scarabaeiformia
- Family: Scarabaeidae
- Subfamily: Melolonthinae
- Tribe: Rhizotrogini
- Genus: Amphitrichia; Brenske, 1894

Genus of leaf beetles

Amphitrichia is a genus of beetles belonging to the family Scarabaeidae.

== Species ==
- Amphitrichia amboinae (Brenske, 1894)
- Amphitrichia angulicalcarata (Itoh, 2003)
- Amphitrichia apoensis (Matsumoto, 2008)
- Amphitrichia bakeri (Moser, 1924)
- Amphitrichia banahaoensis (Moser, 1924)
- Amphitrichia barbigera (Brenske, 1894)
- Amphitrichia barda (Brenske, 1894)
- Amphitrichia bicallosicephala (Matsumoto, 2010)
- Amphitrichia bipunctata (Brenske, 1892)
- Amphitrichia canlaonensis (Matsumoto, 2008)
- Amphitrichia cebuana (Itoh, 2003)
- Amphitrichia celebensis (Lansberge, 1879)
- Amphitrichia constricta (Burmeister, 1855)
- Amphitrichia dannymohagani (Matsumoto, 2008)
- Amphitrichia excavaticollis (Itoh, 2003)
- Amphitrichia flachi (Brenske, 1892)
- Amphitrichia flaviventris (Lansberge, 1879)
- Amphitrichia gracilicalcarata Matsumoto, 2015
- Amphitrichia imugana (Moser, 1924)
- Amphitrichia latecostata (Moser, 1911)
- Amphitrichia luzonica (Moser, 1926)
- Amphitrichia malindangensis (Matsumoto, 2010)
- Amphitrichia mindanaona (Brenske, 1894)
- Amphitrichia mindoroensis (Matsumoto, 2010)
- Amphitrichia moana (Moser, 1912)
- Amphitrichia monticola (Moser, 1915)
- Amphitrichia negrosiana (Chapin, 1931)
- Amphitrichia philippinica (Brenske, 1892)
- Amphitrichia quadrangulata (Brenske, 1896)
- Amphitrichia sexspecula (Chapin, 1931)
- Amphitrichia sorsogona (Chapin, 1931)
- Amphitrichia stylifer (Chapin, 1931)
- Amphitrichia succedanea (Matsumoto, 2008)
- Amphitrichia sulana (Moser, 1912)
- Amphitrichia sumbawana (Brenske, 1896)
- Amphitrichia tenuitibialis (Matsumoto, 2010)
- Amphitrichia unguicularis (Moser, 1912)
- Amphitrichia vidua (Sharp, 1876)
