= Maghrebotrogus parallelus =

Scientific classification
- Kingdom: Animalia
- Phylum: Arthropoda
- Clade: Pancrustacea
- Class: Insecta
- Order: Coleoptera
- Suborder: Polyphaga
- Infraorder: Scarabaeiformia
- Family: Scarabaeidae
- Genus: Maghrebotrogus
- Species: M. parallelus

Binomial name
- Maghrebotrogus parallelus (Fairmaire, 1860)

Synonyms
- Rhizotrogus parallelus Fairmaire, 1860

Species of beetle

Maghrebotrogus parallelus is a species of beetle of the family Scarabaeidae. It is found in Algeria and Morocco.

== Description ==
Adults reach a length of about 11–15 mm (0.43–0.59 in). They have a narrow, yellowish-brown to reddish-brown body, with the head and pronotum often heavily darkened. The head, pronotum and scutellum are glabrous, while the elytra have very short hairs.
