= Maghrebotrogus =

Scientific classification
- Kingdom: Animalia
- Phylum: Arthropoda
- Clade: Pancrustacea
- Class: Insecta
- Order: Coleoptera
- Suborder: Polyphaga
- Infraorder: Scarabaeiformia
- Family: Scarabaeidae
- Subfamily: Melolonthinae
- Tribe: Rhizotrogini
- Genus: Maghrebotrogus; Montreuil & Keith, 2022

Genus of leaf beetles

Maghrebotrogus is a genus of beetles belonging to the family Scarabaeidae.

== Species ==
- Maghrebotrogus altifrons (Baraud, 1971)
- Maghrebotrogus cristatifrons (Fairmaire, 1883)
- Maghrebotrogus hucheti Montreuil & Keith, 2022
- Maghrebotrogus julieni (Baraud, 1972)
- Maghrebotrogus marginiceps (Fairmaire, 1866)
- Maghrebotrogus parallelus (Fairmaire, 1860)
- Maghrebotrogus scutellaris (Lucas, 1846)
- Maghrebotrogus subcristatus (Fairmaire, 1879)
- Maghrebotrogus subparallelus (Escalera, 1913)
- Maghrebotrogus ulianai Montreuil & Keith, 2022
- Maghrebotrogus warioni (Marseul, 1878)
- Maghrebotrogus zinae Montreuil & Keith, 2022
