= Testaceitrichia =

Scientific classification
- Kingdom: Animalia
- Phylum: Arthropoda
- Clade: Pancrustacea
- Class: Insecta
- Order: Coleoptera
- Suborder: Polyphaga
- Infraorder: Scarabaeiformia
- Family: Scarabaeidae
- Subfamily: Melolonthinae
- Tribe: Rhizotrogini
- Genus: Testaceitrichia; Matsumoto, 2021

Synonyms
- Cephalotrichia Matsumoto, 2017

Genus of leaf beetles

Testaceitrichia is a genus of beetles belonging to the family Scarabaeidae.

== Species ==
- Testaceitrichia murzini (Keith, 2006)
- Testaceitrichia sichotana (Brenske, 1896)
