= Tosevskiana =

Scientific classification
- Kingdom: Animalia
- Phylum: Arthropoda
- Clade: Pancrustacea
- Class: Insecta
- Order: Coleoptera
- Suborder: Polyphaga
- Infraorder: Scarabaeiformia
- Family: Scarabaeidae
- Subfamily: Melolonthinae
- Tribe: Rhizotrogini
- Genus: Tosevskiana; Pavićević, 1985

Genus of leaf beetles

Tosevskiana is a genus of beetles belonging to the family Scarabaeidae.

== Species ==
- Tosevskiana inexpectata Pavićević, 1985
- Tosevskiana machackovae Sehnal, 2004
- Tosevskiana sithoniensis (Král, 1998)
