= Brahmina sulcifrons =

Scientific classification
- Kingdom: Animalia
- Phylum: Arthropoda
- Clade: Pancrustacea
- Class: Insecta
- Order: Coleoptera
- Suborder: Polyphaga
- Infraorder: Scarabaeiformia
- Family: Scarabaeidae
- Genus: Brahmina
- Species: B. sulcifrons

Binomial name
- Brahmina sulcifrons Moser, 1913

Species of beetle

Brahmina sulcifrons is a species of beetle of the family Scarabaeidae. It is found in India (Sikkim).

== Description ==
Adults reach a length of about 11 mm. The frons is punctate and covered with erect yellow setae and the antennae are brown. The pronotum is densely punctate and covered with yellowish setae and the lateral margins and the anterior margin are fringed with long yellow cilia.
