= Maghrebotrogus warioni =

Scientific classification
- Kingdom: Animalia
- Phylum: Arthropoda
- Clade: Pancrustacea
- Class: Insecta
- Order: Coleoptera
- Suborder: Polyphaga
- Infraorder: Scarabaeiformia
- Family: Scarabaeidae
- Genus: Maghrebotrogus
- Species: M. warioni

Binomial name
- Maghrebotrogus warioni (Marseul, 1878)

Synonyms
- Rhizotrogus warioni Marseul, 1878; Rhizotrogus (Amadotrogus) melillanum Baraud, 1972

Species of beetle

Maghrebotrogus warioni is a species of beetle of the family Scarabaeidae. It is found in Morocco.

== Description ==
Adults reach a length of about 11–14 mm (0.43–0.55 in). They are reddish-brown, more or less dark and with the pronotum slightly darker. The head, pronotum and scutellum are glabrous, while the elytra have very short hairs.
