= Taiwanotrichia =

Scientific classification
- Kingdom: Animalia
- Phylum: Arthropoda
- Clade: Pancrustacea
- Class: Insecta
- Order: Coleoptera
- Suborder: Polyphaga
- Infraorder: Scarabaeiformia
- Family: Scarabaeidae
- Subfamily: Melolonthinae
- Tribe: Heptophyllini
- Genus: Taiwanotrichia; Kobayashi, 1990

Genus of beetles

Taiwanotrichia is a genus of beetles belonging to the family Scarabaeidae.

== Species ==
- Taiwanotrichia dorsopilosa Li & Yang, 1991
- Taiwanotrichia hainanensis Keith & Li, 2009
- Taiwanotrichia longicornis Kobayashi, 1990
- Taiwanotrichia similis Li & Yang, 1991
- Taiwanotrichia sinocontinentalis Keith, 2009
