= Amphitrichia monticola =

Scientific classification
- Kingdom: Animalia
- Phylum: Arthropoda
- Clade: Pancrustacea
- Class: Insecta
- Order: Coleoptera
- Suborder: Polyphaga
- Infraorder: Scarabaeiformia
- Family: Scarabaeidae
- Genus: Amphitrichia
- Species: A. monticola

Binomial name
- Amphitrichia monticola (Moser, 1915)

Synonyms
- Holotrichia monticola Moser, 1915

Species of beetle

Amphitrichia monticola is a species of beetle of the family Scarabaeidae. It is found in the Philippines (Luzon).

== Description ==
Adults reach a length of about 18 mm (0.71 in). They are similar to Amphitrichia flachi in shape and colouration, but they are significantly smaller and the clypeus and pronotum are differently formed. The head is wrinkled and punctate, the sides of the clypeus are parallel in the posterior part and the anterior angles are broadly rounded. The upturned anterior margin is emarginate in the middle. The antennae are brown. The pronotum is two and a half times as wide as it is long in the middle, tapering anteriorly and posteriorly. The lateral margins are not notched and run much less obliquely towards the base behind the middle than in A. flachi. The posterior angles are obtuse and shortly rounded. The lateral margins are very weakly emarginate before the middle, the anterior angles are slightly upturned, projecting, and acutely angular. The upper surface of the pronotum is quite widely punctate in the middle, becoming slightly more closely punctate towards the sides. The scutellum is punctured along the lateral margins. The elytra are very slightly wrinkled and quite widely covered with umbilical punctures. The ribs are only very indistinctly marked. The punctures on the pygidium are also quite scattered. The thorax is covered with yellowish hairs, the abdomen is unpunctate in the middle, while the sides of the abdomen show fine punctation.
