= Brahmina sculpticollis =

Scientific classification
- Kingdom: Animalia
- Phylum: Arthropoda
- Clade: Pancrustacea
- Class: Insecta
- Order: Coleoptera
- Suborder: Polyphaga
- Infraorder: Scarabaeiformia
- Family: Scarabaeidae
- Genus: Brahmina
- Species: B. sculpticollis

Binomial name
- Brahmina sculpticollis Frey, 1969

Species of beetle

Brahmina sculpticollis is a species of beetle of the family Scarabaeidae. It is found in Nepal.

== Description ==
Adults reach a length of about 12–13 mm. The dorsal and ventral surface are light brown to dark brown and shiny, sometimes with the disc of the pronotum darker. The antennae and legs are yellowish-brown.
