= Eotrichia =

Scientific classification
- Kingdom: Animalia
- Phylum: Arthropoda
- Clade: Pancrustacea
- Class: Insecta
- Order: Coleoptera
- Suborder: Polyphaga
- Infraorder: Scarabaeiformia
- Family: Scarabaeidae
- Subfamily: Melolonthinae
- Tribe: Rhizotrogini
- Genus: Eotrichia; Medvedev, 1951

Genus of leaf beetles

Eotrichia is a genus of beetles belonging to the family Scarabaeidae.

== Species ==
- Eotrichia alcocki (Brenske, 1899)
- Eotrichia assamensis (Brenske, 1896)
- Eotrichia biehli (Brenske, 1892)
- Eotrichia biscuspis (Moser, 1912)
- Eotrichia bombycina (Brenske, 1892)
- Eotrichia braeti (Brenske, 1896)
- Eotrichia brevispina (Zhang, 1964)
- Eotrichia cameronica (Arrow, 1938)
- Eotrichia capitalis (Zhang, 1964)
- Eotrichia cavifrons (Brenske, 1892)
- Eotrichia cheni (Zhang, 1964)
- Eotrichia ciliaticollis (Moser, 1912)
- Eotrichia costipennis (Moser, 1912)
- Eotrichia eberti (Keith, 2008)
- Eotrichia emarginatipennis (Matsumoto, 2013)
- Eotrichia femoralis (Zhang, 1964)
- Eotrichia foveolata (Brenske, 1892)
- Eotrichia frontalis (Brenske, 1892)
- Eotrichia glabricollis (Brenske, 1896)
- Eotrichia hainanensis (Zhang, 1964)
- Eotrichia hirtidorsalis (Matsumoto, 2013)
- Eotrichia impressicollis (Moser, 1909)
- Eotrichia javana (Brenske, 1892)
- Eotrichia laticollis (Moser, 1921)
- Eotrichia longipennis (Blanchard, 1851)
- Eotrichia maxima (Zhang, 1964)
- Eotrichia nepalensis (Frey, 1972)
- Eotrichia nigrithoracica (Matsumoto, 2013)
- Eotrichia niponensis (Lewis, 1895)
- Eotrichia nitida (Brenske, 1892)
- Eotrichia pallidipennis (Arrow, 1946)
- Eotrichia pilosa (Brenske, 1896)
- Eotrichia protracta (Bates, 1891)
- Eotrichia scrobiculata (Brenske, 1892)
- Eotrichia scrobipennis (Brenske, 1899)
- Eotrichia sericina (Frey, 1971)
- Eotrichia setosifrons (Khan & Ghai, 1982)
- Eotrichia sikkimensis (Brenske, 1892)
- Eotrichia staudingeri (Brenske, 1892)
- Eotrichia subiridea (Fairmaire, 1891)
- Eotrichia sumatrensis (Sharp, 1881)
- Eotrichia taiwana (Nomura, 1977)
- Eotrichia tarsalis (Zhang, 1964)
- Eotrichia tonkinensis (Moser, 1908)
- Eotrichia tsignata (Zhang, 1964)
- Eotrichia variolosa Keith, Pham & Sabatinelli, 2024
- Eotrichia yatungensis (Zhang, 1964)
