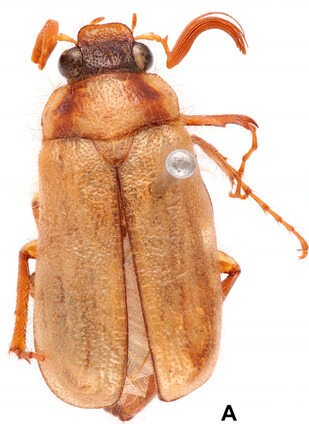

Scientific classification
- Kingdom: Animalia
- Phylum: Arthropoda
- Clade: Pancrustacea
- Class: Insecta
- Order: Coleoptera
- Suborder: Polyphaga
- Infraorder: Scarabaeiformia
- Family: Scarabaeidae
- Genus: Hilyotrogus
- Species: H. flavescens

Binomial name
- Hilyotrogus flavescens (Zhang, 1997)

Synonyms
- Melichrus flavescens Zhang, 1997

= Hilyotrogus flavescens =

Species of beetle

Hilyotrogus flavescens is a species of beetle of the family Scarabaeidae. It is found in China (Chongqing).
