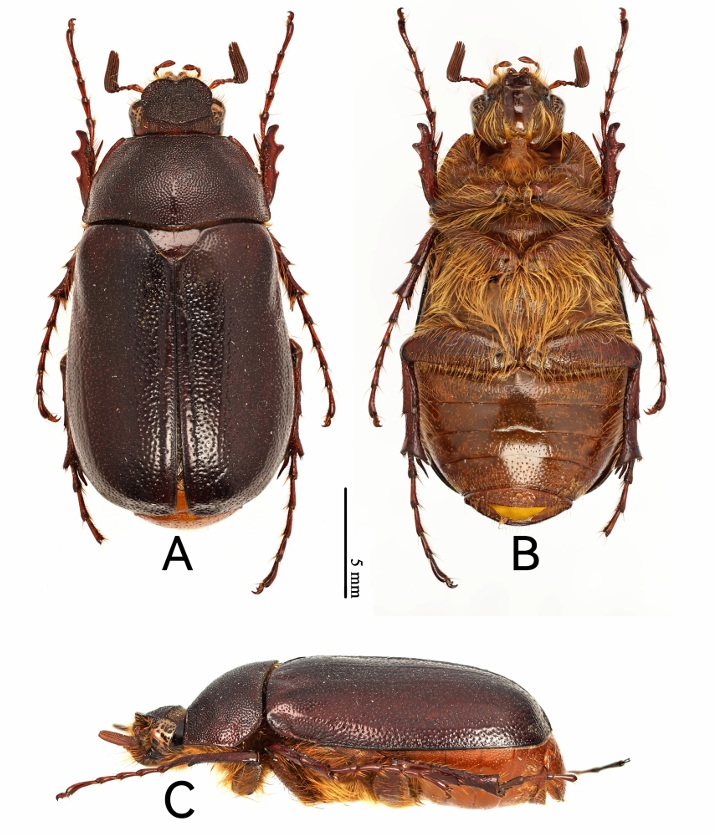
- Megistophylla chinensis

Scientific classification
- Kingdom: Animalia
- Phylum: Arthropoda
- Clade: Pancrustacea
- Class: Insecta
- Order: Coleoptera
- Suborder: Polyphaga
- Infraorder: Scarabaeiformia
- Family: Scarabaeidae
- Subfamily: Melolonthinae
- Tribe: Rhizotrogini
- Genus: Megistophylla; Burmeister, 1855

Synonyms
- Hecatomnus Fairmaire, 1891

= Megistophylla =

Genus of beetles

Megistophylla is a genus of scarab beetles.

== Species ==
- Megistophylla andrewesi Moser, 1913
- Megistophylla brevivirgata Wang & Gao, 2024
- Megistophylla chinensis Zhang & Li, 2025
- Megistophylla dolichocera Arrow, 1925
- Megistophylla formosana Wang & Li, 2016
- Megistophylla grandicornis (Fairmaire, 1891)
- Megistophylla heptophylla Moser, 1913
- Megistophylla hirsutissima Keith, 2020
- Megistophylla indica (Brenske, 1899)
- Megistophylla junghuhni Burmeister, 1855
- Megistophylla keithi Wang & Gao, 2024
- Megistophylla lamdongensis Keith, 2020
- Megistophylla microlamellata Keith, 2020
- Megistophylla octobracchia Gao & Li, 2019
- Megistophylla pentaphylla Arrow, 1925
- Megistophylla planiceps Arrow, 1941
- Megistophylla punctata Arrow, 1938
- Megistophylla sumatrana Moser, 1913
- Megistophylla wangae Zhang & Li, 2025
- Megistophylla xitoui Li & Wang, 2016
