= Latipalpus latipalpis =

Scientific classification
- Kingdom: Animalia
- Phylum: Arthropoda
- Clade: Pancrustacea
- Class: Insecta
- Order: Coleoptera
- Suborder: Polyphaga
- Infraorder: Scarabaeiformia
- Family: Scarabaeidae
- Genus: Latipalpus
- Species: L. latipalpis

Binomial name
- Latipalpus latipalpis (Moser, 1912)

Synonyms
- Holotrichia latipalpis Moser, 1912

Species of beetle

Latipalpus latipalpis is a species of beetle of the family Scarabaeidae. It is found in Indonesia (Java).

== Description ==
Adults reach a length of about 20 mm (0.79 in). They are brown and glossy, with a darker center on the pronotum and yellowish-brown elytra. The head is wrinkled and punctured, and the anterior margin of the clypeus is not emarginate. The pronotum is extensively covered with rather coarse punctures, which bear erect yellow hairs before the anterior margin. A smooth median line is visible in the posterior half. The lateral margins are arched and widened in the middle, tapering more anteriorly than posteriorly. The scutellum has a smooth median line. The elytra are moderately densely covered with coarse punctures, the ribs bear only scattered punctures, and the lateral margins are fringed with yellow cilia. The weakly convex pygidium is sparsely punctured. The thorax is densely covered with shaggy yellow hairs and the abdomen is sparsely punctured.
