= Amphitrichia bicallosicephala =

Scientific classification
- Kingdom: Animalia
- Phylum: Arthropoda
- Clade: Pancrustacea
- Class: Insecta
- Order: Coleoptera
- Suborder: Polyphaga
- Infraorder: Scarabaeiformia
- Family: Scarabaeidae
- Genus: Amphitrichia
- Species: A. bicallosicephala

Binomial name
- Amphitrichia bicallosicephala (Matsumoto, 2010)

Synonyms
- Holotrichia bicallosicephala Matsumoto, 2010

Species of beetle

Amphitrichia bicallosicephala is a species of beetle of the family Scarabaeidae. It is found in the Philippines (Mindoro).

== Description ==
Adults reach a length of about 22.3–26.5 mm (0.88–1.04 in). They have a long body, with the head, pronotum, scutellum, pro- to metasterna and legs dark brown, and the elytra, pygidium and abdomen brighter brown. The dorsal surface is weakly shining.

== Etymology ==
The species was named after the presence of a pair of callosities on the frons.
