= Amphitrichia unguicularis =

Scientific classification
- Kingdom: Animalia
- Phylum: Arthropoda
- Clade: Pancrustacea
- Class: Insecta
- Order: Coleoptera
- Suborder: Polyphaga
- Infraorder: Scarabaeiformia
- Family: Scarabaeidae
- Genus: Amphitrichia
- Species: A. unguicularis

Binomial name
- Amphitrichia unguicularis (Moser, 1912)

Synonyms
- Holotrichia unguicularis Moser, 1912

Species of beetle

Amphitrichia unguicularis is a species of beetle of the family Scarabaeidae. It is found in Brunei and the Philippines (Palawan).

== Description ==
Adults reach a length of about 20–22 mm (0.79–0.87 in). They are black. The head is coarsely, and the frons is moderately densely punctured, with the clypeus more densely punctured. The latter is rather deeply emarginate in the middle of the anterior margin. The antennae are brown, with the club darker. The pronotum is wider than long, sparsely punctured, with slightly denser and coarser punctures on the sides. The lateral margins are very weakly notched, widening in an arcuate shape behind the middle, the anterior angles projecting, the posterior angles obtuse. The scutellum is sparsely punctured, with a smooth midline. The elytral punctures are rather sparse, the ribs only very faintly prominent. The pygidium is sparsely covered with umbilical punctures. The underside is glossy and almost smooth in the middle, the sides are dull and sparsely punctured.
