= Toxospathius =

Scientific classification
- Kingdom: Animalia
- Phylum: Arthropoda
- Clade: Pancrustacea
- Class: Insecta
- Order: Coleoptera
- Suborder: Polyphaga
- Infraorder: Scarabaeiformia
- Family: Scarabaeidae
- Subfamily: Melolonthinae
- Tribe: Heptophyllini
- Genus: Toxospathius; Fairmaire, 1878

Genus of beetles

Toxospathius is a genus of beetles belonging to the family Scarabaeidae.

== Species ==
- Toxospathius auriventris Bates, 1891
- Toxospathius brevicollis Arrow, 1934
- Toxospathius inconstans Fairmaire, 1878
