= Latipalpus =

Scientific classification
- Kingdom: Animalia
- Phylum: Arthropoda
- Clade: Pancrustacea
- Class: Insecta
- Order: Coleoptera
- Suborder: Polyphaga
- Infraorder: Scarabaeiformia
- Family: Scarabaeidae
- Subfamily: Melolonthinae
- Tribe: Rhizotrogini
- Genus: Latipalpus; Moser, 1921

Genus of leaf beetles

Latipalpus is a genus of beetles belonging to the family Scarabaeidae.

== Species ==
- Latipalpus dannymohagani Matsumoto, 2005
- Latipalpus elegans Itoh, 1999
- Latipalpus fujiokai Itoh, 1999
- Latipalpus latipalpis (Moser, 1912)
- Latipalpus maxillatus (Brenske, 1892)
- Latipalpus occidentalis Itoh, 1998
- Latipalpus palpalis Moser, 1921
- Latipalpus truncatipalpis Moser, 1921
