= Brahmina chingjinyui =

Scientific classification
- Kingdom: Animalia
- Phylum: Arthropoda
- Clade: Pancrustacea
- Class: Insecta
- Order: Coleoptera
- Suborder: Polyphaga
- Infraorder: Scarabaeiformia
- Family: Scarabaeidae
- Genus: Brahmina
- Species: B. chingjinyui

Binomial name
- Brahmina chingjinyui Kobayashi, 1993

Synonyms
- Brahmina pubiventris Kobayashi, 1993 (preocc.)

Species of beetle

Brahmina chingjinyui is a species of beetle of the family Scarabaeidae. It is found in Taiwan.

== Description ==
Adults are approximately 12–14 mm long. They have a shiny, dark reddish-brown to reddish-brown, elongate body, with a darker pronotum that sometimes has light-brown sides. The head is blackish brown, and the ventral surface ranges from light yellowish brown to yellowish brown. The antennal club is dark reddish brown to dark brown. The clypeus, anterior and lateral margins of the pronotum, and posterior margin of the pygidium bear scattered long hairs.
