= Heptophylla =

Scientific classification
- Kingdom: Animalia
- Phylum: Arthropoda
- Clade: Pancrustacea
- Class: Insecta
- Order: Coleoptera
- Suborder: Polyphaga
- Infraorder: Scarabaeiformia
- Family: Scarabaeidae
- Subfamily: Melolonthinae
- Tribe: Heptophyllini
- Genus: Heptophylla; Motschulsky, 1857

Synonyms
- Hypochrus Fairmaire, 1891

Genus of beetles

Heptophylla is a genus of beetles belonging to the family Scarabaeidae.

== Species ==
- Heptophylla brevicollis (Fairmaire, 1891)
- Heptophylla calcarata Zhang, 1981
- Heptophylla dimidiata Arrow, 1934
- Heptophylla gongshana Bezděk & Král, 2025
- Heptophylla laticollis Zhang, 1995
- Heptophylla longilamella Zhang, 1981
- Heptophylla picea Motschulsky, 1857
