= Eotrichia ciliaticollis =

Scientific classification
- Kingdom: Animalia
- Phylum: Arthropoda
- Clade: Pancrustacea
- Class: Insecta
- Order: Coleoptera
- Suborder: Polyphaga
- Infraorder: Scarabaeiformia
- Family: Scarabaeidae
- Genus: Eotrichia
- Species: E. ciliaticollis

Binomial name
- Eotrichia ciliaticollis (Moser, 1912)

Synonyms
- Holotrichia ciliaticollis Moser, 1912

Species of beetle

Eotrichia ciliaticollis is a species of beetle of the family Scarabaeidae. It is found in Vietnam.

== Description ==
Adults reach a length of about 18–23 mm (0.71–0.91 in). They are reddish-brown, almost dull above, with the head and pronotum darker. The head is coarsely and wrinkledly punctate, and the margin of the clypeus is slightly upturned, and emarginate anteriorly in the middle. The antennae are brown. The pronotum is twice as wide as it is long and rather densely punctate. The punctures are not deep on the disc, but coarser on the sides, and the interstices are wrinkled. The sides of the pronotum are arched and crenate, with long, yellowish-brown cilia. The scutellum is quite densely punctured, with a smooth midline. The elytra are widely punctured, with the ribs almost smooth.
