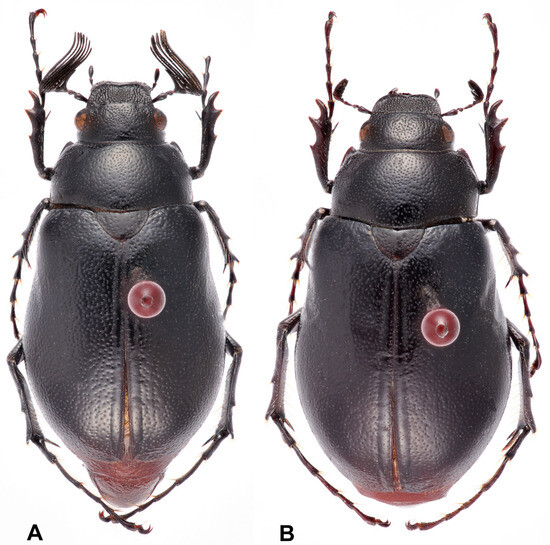

Scientific classification
- Kingdom: Animalia
- Phylum: Arthropoda
- Clade: Pancrustacea
- Class: Insecta
- Order: Coleoptera
- Suborder: Polyphaga
- Infraorder: Scarabaeiformia
- Family: Scarabaeidae
- Genus: Heptophylla
- Species: H. gongshana

Binomial name
- Heptophylla gongshana Bezděk & Král, 2025

= Heptophylla gongshana =

Species of beetle

Heptophylla gongshana is a species of beetle of the family Scarabaeidae. It is found in China (Yunnan).

== Description ==
Adults reach a length of about 13.6–14.7 mm (0.54–0.58 in). They have an elongated body, with a plump abdomen. They are all black except for the considerably chestnut-colored penultimate and last abdominal segments (propygidium and pygidium). The whole surface is strongly shiny and there is considerably sparse and short, yellowish–whitish macrosetation.

== Etymology ==
The species name refers to the type locality, Gongshan County in northwestern Yunnan.
