= Amadotrogus =

Scientific classification
- Kingdom: Animalia
- Phylum: Arthropoda
- Clade: Pancrustacea
- Class: Insecta
- Order: Coleoptera
- Suborder: Polyphaga
- Infraorder: Scarabaeiformia
- Family: Scarabaeidae
- Subfamily: Melolonthinae
- Tribe: Rhizotrogini
- Genus: Amadotrogus; Reitter, 1902

Synonyms
- Amphimallus (Amadotrogus) Reitter, 1902

Genus of leaf beetles

Amadotrogus is a genus of beetles belonging to the family Scarabaeidae.

== Species ==
- Amadotrogus insubricus (Burmeister, 1855)
- Amadotrogus luigionii Fabbriciani, Patacchiola & Boschin, 2024
- Amadotrogus oertzeni (Brenske, 1886)
- Amadotrogus patruelis (Reiche, 1862)
- Amadotrogus quercanus (Burmeister, 1855)
- Amadotrogus truncatus (Brenske, 1886)
- Amadotrogus vicinus (Mulsant, 1842)
