= Paraholotrichia =

Scientific classification
- Kingdom: Animalia
- Phylum: Arthropoda
- Clade: Pancrustacea
- Class: Insecta
- Order: Coleoptera
- Suborder: Polyphaga
- Infraorder: Scarabaeiformia
- Family: Scarabaeidae
- Subfamily: Melolonthinae
- Tribe: Rhizotrogini
- Genus: Paraholotrichia; Lacroix & Coache, 2017
- Species: P. rainoni

Binomial name
- Paraholotrichia rainoni Lacroix & Coache, 2017

Genus of beetles

Paraholotrichia is a genus of beetle of the family Scarabaeidae. It is monotypic, being represented by the single species, Paraholotrichia rainoni, which is found in Benin.

== Description ==
Adults reach a length of about 18–20 mm (0.71–0.79 in). They have an elongated, plain dark brown body.
