= Hexataenius =

Scientific classification
- Kingdom: Animalia
- Phylum: Arthropoda
- Clade: Pancrustacea
- Class: Insecta
- Order: Coleoptera
- Suborder: Polyphaga
- Infraorder: Scarabaeiformia
- Family: Scarabaeidae
- Subfamily: Melolonthinae
- Tribe: Heptophyllini
- Genus: Hexataenius; Fairmaire, 1891

Genus of beetles

Hexataenius is a genus of beetles belonging to the family Scarabaeidae.

== Species ==
- Hexataenius ezakii (Niijima & Kinoshita, 1923)
- Hexataenius protensus Fairmaire, 1891
