= Amphitrichia cebuana =

Scientific classification
- Kingdom: Animalia
- Phylum: Arthropoda
- Clade: Pancrustacea
- Class: Insecta
- Order: Coleoptera
- Suborder: Polyphaga
- Infraorder: Scarabaeiformia
- Family: Scarabaeidae
- Genus: Amphitrichia
- Species: A. cebuana

Binomial name
- Amphitrichia cebuana (Itoh, 2003)

Synonyms
- Holotrichia cebuana Itoh, 2003

Species of beetle

Amphitrichia cebuana is a species of beetle of the family Scarabaeidae. It is found in the Philippines (Cebu).

== Description ==
Adults reach a length of about 20.5–22.7 mm (0.81–0.89 in). The head, pronotum (except for lateral portions) and scutellum are dark blackish brown, while the antennae, lateral portions of the pronotum, elytra and pygidium are dark brown with a faint reddish tinge. The legs and most of the ventral surface are dark yellowish brown to lighter yellowish brown.
