= Brahmina =

Scientific classification
- Kingdom: Animalia
- Phylum: Arthropoda
- Clade: Pancrustacea
- Class: Insecta
- Order: Coleoptera
- Suborder: Polyphaga
- Infraorder: Scarabaeiformia
- Superfamily: Scarabaeoidea
- Family: Scarabaeidae
- Subfamily: Melolonthinae
- Tribe: Rhizotrogini
- Genus: Brahmina; Blanchard, 1851

Type species
- Brahmina comata Blanchard, 1851

Synonyms
- Schistocometa Brenske, 1903; Coniotrogus Brenske, 1903; Pseudolontha Fairmaire, 1897; Rhizocolax Motschulsky, 1860

Genus of beetles

Brahmina is a large Palearctic genus of scarab beetles in the tribe Melolonthini, containing over 90 species in three subgenera.

Blanchard established the genus in a museum catalogue dated 1850 (but actually published in 1851) and separated the genus from related Rhizotrogus the basis of the claws being split at the tip. This character is also seen in Phytalus. Cryphaeobius, and Rhizocolax from which Brahmina may be separated in that the abdomen is only slightly or not recessed at the pygydium tip. The male antenna club is short and only slightly longer than in the female. The tarsal claw is split at the tip and the lower tooth is shorter and wider than the upper tooth.

== Species ==
- Brahmina abdominalis (Brenske, 1903)
- Brahmina abscessa Brenske, 1892
- Brahmina adaequata Moser, 1909
- Brahmina agnella (Faldermann, 1835)
- Brahmina amurensis Brenske, 1892
- Brahmina assamensis Moser, 1913
- Brahmina bengalensis Nonfried, 1891
- Brahmina braeti Brenske, 1896
- Brahmina brevipilosa Moser, 1918
- Brahmina brunneosparsa Arrow, 1946
- Brahmina buruensis Brenske, 1892
- Brahmina callosifrons Moser, 1913
- Brahmina canaliculata (Fairmaire, 1897)
- Brahmina cardoni Brenske, 1892
- Brahmina cariniclypea Nomura, 1977
- Brahmina carinifrons (Moser, 1909)
- Brahmina chingjinyui Kobayashi, 1993
- Brahmina ciliaticollis Moser, 1914
- Brahmina comata Blanchard, 1851
- Brahmina coriacea (Hope, 1831)
- Brahmina crenicollis (Motschulsky, 1854)
- Brahmina cribriceps Moser, 1915
- Brahmina cribricollis (Redtenbacher, 1844)
- Brahmina crinicollis Burmeister, 1855
- Brahmina cuprea Mittal & Pajni, 1977
- Brahmina cylindrica (Gyllenhal, 1817)
- Brahmina darcisi Reitter, 1902
- Brahmina doeberli Keith, 2012
- Brahmina dubitabilis (Fairmaire, 1891)
- Brahmina elongata Moser, 1913
- Brahmina excisiceps Moser, 1915
- Brahmina extraria Keith, 2009
- Brahmina faldermanni Kraatz, 1892
- Brahmina flabellata Brenske, 1892
- Brahmina flavipennis Moser, 1913
- Brahmina glabellus (Nikolajev & Kabakov, 1980)
- Brahmina hindu Keith, 2006
- Brahmina itohi Kobayashi, 2000
- Brahmina jubata Frey, 1969
- Brahmina kabakovi (Nikolajev, 1976)
- Brahmina kurseongana Moser, 1924
- Brahmina latericostata (Fairmaire, 1888)
- Brahmina lutea Moser, 1913
- Brahmina macrophylla Moser, 1913
- Brahmina malaccensis (Kirsch, 1875)
- Brahmina mandarina Reitter, 1902
- Brahmina microphylla Brenske, 1892
- Brahmina mikado Itoh, 1996
- Brahmina miyako Itoh, 1996
- Brahmina moluccana Moser, 1909
- Brahmina monticola Kobayashi, 1993
- Brahmina moseri (Saylor, 1937)
- Brahmina mysoreensis Frey, 1971
- Brahmina nomurai Itoh, 1989
- Brahmina nuda Moser, 1915
- Brahmina parvula Moser, 1915
- Brahmina perakensis Moser, 1913
- Brahmina phytaloides Brenske, 1892
- Brahmina pilifrons Moser, 1913
- Brahmina plagiatula Brenske, 1896
- Brahmina potanini (Semenov, 1891)
- Brahmina pseudobrunneosparsa Keith, 2008
- Brahmina pseudoglabella Keith, 2008
- Brahmina pubiventris (Burmeister, 1855)
- Brahmina pulchella (Motschulsky, 1853)
- Brahmina pumila (Sharp, 1881)
- Brahmina quasibrunneosparsa Keith, 2008
- Brahmina rubetra (Faldermann, 1835)
- Brahmina ruficollis Moser, 1915
- Brahmina rugifrons Moser, 1918
- Brahmina rugosicollis Frey, 1971
- Brahmina ruida Zhang & Wang, 1997
- Brahmina sakishimana Nomura, 1965
- Brahmina sculpticollis Frey, 1969
- Brahmina sedakovii (Mannerheim, 1849)
- Brahmina senescens (Frivaldszky, 1890)
- Brahmina serricollis (Motschulsky, 1853)
- Brahmina shibatai Kobayashi, 1987
- Brahmina shillongensis Brenske, 1899
- Brahmina siamensis Brenske, 1892
- Brahmina simlana Moser, 1913
- Brahmina simplex Frey, 1972
- Brahmina sophropoides Arrow, 1946
- Brahmina soror Arrow, 1946
- Brahmina subsericea (Moser, 1908)
- Brahmina sulcifrons Moser, 1913
- Brahmina sumatrensis Brenske, 1892
- Brahmina taitungensis Nomura, 1977
- Brahmina tavoyensis Brenske, 1892
- Brahmina turcestana Brenske, 1892
- Brahmina wutaiensis Zhang & Wang, 1997
- Brahmina yunnana Moser, 1915
