= Maghrebotrogus ulianai =

Scientific classification
- Kingdom: Animalia
- Phylum: Arthropoda
- Clade: Pancrustacea
- Class: Insecta
- Order: Coleoptera
- Suborder: Polyphaga
- Infraorder: Scarabaeiformia
- Family: Scarabaeidae
- Genus: Maghrebotrogus
- Species: M. ulianai

Binomial name
- Maghrebotrogus ulianai Montreuil & Keith, 2022

Species of beetle

Maghrebotrogus ulianai is a species of beetle of the family Scarabaeidae. It is found in Morocco.

== Description ==
Adults reach a length of about 9.5–12 mm (0.37–0.47 in). They are dark yellowish-brown to dark reddish-brown, often with a darker pronotum. The head, pronotum and scutellum are glabrous, while he elytra have very short hairs.

== Etymology ==
This species is dedicated to Marco Uliana, a specialist in Palearctic Scarabaeidae.
