= Hilyotrogus =

Scientific classification
- Kingdom: Animalia
- Phylum: Arthropoda
- Clade: Pancrustacea
- Class: Insecta
- Order: Coleoptera
- Suborder: Polyphaga
- Infraorder: Scarabaeiformia
- Family: Scarabaeidae
- Subfamily: Melolonthinae
- Tribe: Heptophyllini
- Genus: Hilyotrogus; Fairmaire, 1886

Synonyms
- Melichrus Brenske, 1892

Genus of beetles

Hilyotrogus is a genus of beetles belonging to the family Scarabaeidae.

== Species ==
- Hilyotrogus assamensis Moser, 1913
- Hilyotrogus aurosericeus (Brenske, 1892)
- Hilyotrogus bicoloreus (Heyden, 1887)
- Hilyotrogus birmanicus Arrow, 1946
- Hilyotrogus calcaratus (Frey, 1971)
- Hilyotrogus changbaishanensis Li, 1992
- Hilyotrogus cribratulus Fairmaire, 1893
- Hilyotrogus flavescens (Zhang, 1997)
- Hilyotrogus flavosericeus (Brenske, 1896)
- Hilyotrogus formosanus (Niijima & Kinoshita, 1927)
- Hilyotrogus hirsutissimus Keith, 2004
- Hilyotrogus holosericeus (Redtenbacher, 1844)
- Hilyotrogus iridipennis Fairmaire, 1886
- Hilyotrogus kolbei (Brenske, 1892)
- Hilyotrogus longiclavis Bates, 1893
- Hilyotrogus luteosericeus (Brenske, 1896)
- Hilyotrogus mangkamensis Zhang, 1981
- Hilyotrogus nitens Frey, 1975
- Hilyotrogus ochraceosericeus Moser, 1913
- Hilyotrogus piceosericeus Moser, 1913
- Hilyotrogus pilicollis Moser, 1913
- Hilyotrogus pilifer Moser, 1921
- Hilyotrogus rufosericeus Moser, 1913
- Hilyotrogus sericeus Moser, 1915
- Hilyotrogus setiger Moser, 1915
- Hilyotrogus setipennis Moser, 1913
- Hilyotrogus sikkimensis Moser, 1913
- Hilyotrogus stolidus Fairmaire, 1886
- Hilyotrogus subsericeus (Moser, 1908)
- Hilyotrogus unguicularis Fairmaire, 1886
- Hilyotrogus vietnamensis Keith, 2012
- Hilyotrogus wittmeri Frey, 1975
- Hilyotrogus yasuii (Nomura, 1970)
