= Amphitrichia malindangensis =

Scientific classification
- Kingdom: Animalia
- Phylum: Arthropoda
- Clade: Pancrustacea
- Class: Insecta
- Order: Coleoptera
- Suborder: Polyphaga
- Infraorder: Scarabaeiformia
- Family: Scarabaeidae
- Genus: Amphitrichia
- Species: A. malindangensis

Binomial name
- Amphitrichia malindangensis (Matsumoto, 2010)

Synonyms
- Holotrichia malindangensis Matsumoto, 2010

Species of beetle

Amphitrichia malindangensis is a species of beetle of the family Scarabaeidae. It is found in the Philippines (Mindanao).

== Description ==
Adults reach a length of about 18.4–20.6 mm (0.72–0.81 in). The head, pronotum and scutellum are almost blackish, while the antennae, elytra, pygidium, prosternum and legs are reddish brown, the meso- to metasterna dark brown and the abdomen yellowish brown. The dorsal surface is weakly shining.

== Etymology ==
The species is named after the type locality, Mt. Malindang.
