= Maghrebotrogus subcristatus =

Scientific classification
- Kingdom: Animalia
- Phylum: Arthropoda
- Clade: Pancrustacea
- Class: Insecta
- Order: Coleoptera
- Suborder: Polyphaga
- Infraorder: Scarabaeiformia
- Family: Scarabaeidae
- Genus: Maghrebotrogus
- Species: M. subcristatus

Binomial name
- Maghrebotrogus subcristatus (Fairmaire, 1879)

Synonyms
- Rhizotrogus subcristatus Fairmaire, 1879; Amphimallus subcristatus

Species of beetle

Maghrebotrogus subcristatus is a species of beetle of the family Scarabaeidae. It is found in Algeria.

== Description ==
Adults reach a length of about 11–12 mm (0.43–0.47 in). They are yellowish-brown to reddish-brown, with the head and pronotum sometimes slightly darker. The head, pronotum and scutellum are glabrous, while the elytra have very short hairs.
