= Brahmina flavipennis =

Scientific classification
- Kingdom: Animalia
- Phylum: Arthropoda
- Clade: Pancrustacea
- Class: Insecta
- Order: Coleoptera
- Suborder: Polyphaga
- Infraorder: Scarabaeiformia
- Family: Scarabaeidae
- Genus: Brahmina
- Species: B. flavipennis

Binomial name
- Brahmina flavipennis Moser, 1913

Species of beetle

Brahmina flavipennis is a species of beetle of the family Scarabaeidae. It is found in Sri Lanka.

== Description ==
Adults reach a length of about 13–17 mm (0.51–0.67 in). They are similar to Brahmina phytaloides in coloration, but differs greatly in sculpture. The head is widely and coarsely punctate, the punctures are fringed with yellow setae. The frons is smooth before the clypeus suture, the clypeus margin is upturned and barely notched in the middle. The pronotum is widely punctate, strongly arched in the middle, tapering considerably more towards the anterior than towards the posterior. The anterior margin and the lateral margins are fringed with yellow cilia. The scutellum bears only a few punctures. The weakly wrinkled elytra are not densely covered with rather strong punctures, the ribs are only faintly noticeable as smoother lines. The pygidium is moderately densely covered with umbilical punctures, some of which bear thin yellowish hairs. The chest is covered with yellow hairs, the abdomen almost smooth in the middle, sparsely punctured on the sides, the punctures bearing yellow setae.
