= Brahmina monticola =

Scientific classification
- Kingdom: Animalia
- Phylum: Arthropoda
- Clade: Pancrustacea
- Class: Insecta
- Order: Coleoptera
- Suborder: Polyphaga
- Infraorder: Scarabaeiformia
- Family: Scarabaeidae
- Genus: Brahmina
- Species: B. monticola

Binomial name
- Brahmina monticola Kobayashi, 1993

Species of beetle

Brahmina monticola is a species of beetle of the family Scarabaeidae. It is found in Taiwan.

== Description ==
Adults reach a length of about 12.5–15.5 mm. They have a dark reddish brown to reddish brown, elongate, shining body, with the pronotum darker (and sometimes with light brown sides. The head is blackish brown and the ventral surface is light yellowish brown. The antennae are light brown. The clypeus, anterior and lateral margins of the pronotum, sides of the elytra and posterior margin of the pygidium have scattered long hairs.
