= Eotrichia biscuspis =

Scientific classification
- Kingdom: Animalia
- Phylum: Arthropoda
- Clade: Pancrustacea
- Class: Insecta
- Order: Coleoptera
- Suborder: Polyphaga
- Infraorder: Scarabaeiformia
- Family: Scarabaeidae
- Genus: Eotrichia
- Species: E. biscuspis

Binomial name
- Eotrichia biscuspis (Moser, 1912)

Synonyms
- Holotrichia biscuspis Moser, 1912

Species of beetle

Eotrichia biscuspis is a species of beetle of the family Scarabaeidae. It is found in Vietnam.

== Description ==
Adults reach a length of about 23–28 mm (0.91–1.10 in). The upper tibiae are brown and pruinose, while the head and pronotum are darker. The head is densely punctured, the frons almost wrinkled, and more or less smooth at the clypeus suture. The anterior margin of the clypeus is not emarginate. The antennae are brown. The pronotum is finely and moderately densely punctured, its sides are crenate, strongly arched in the middle, and the anterior and posterior angles are shortly rounded. The scutellum is finely punctured. The elytra are somewhat more strongly punctured beside the suture than on the sides, and the weakly prominent ribs bear only a few punctures. The yellow pygidium is somewhat more strongly punctate towards the posterior margin than in the anterior part, sometimes faintly wrinkled. The thorax is densely covered with yellowish hairs, the abdomen is glossy in the middle, somewhat dull at the sides, and the last abdominal segment bears a smooth transverse ridge before the anterior margin.
