= Milatrogus =

Scientific classification
- Kingdom: Animalia
- Phylum: Arthropoda
- Clade: Pancrustacea
- Class: Insecta
- Order: Coleoptera
- Suborder: Polyphaga
- Infraorder: Scarabaeiformia
- Family: Scarabaeidae
- Subfamily: Melolonthinae
- Tribe: Rhizotrogini
- Genus: Milatrogus; Montreuil & Keith, 2022
- Species: M. amphibolus

Binomial name
- Milatrogus amphibolus (Peyerimhoff, 1945)

Synonyms
- Rhizotrogus (Amphimallon) amphibolus Peyerimhoff, 1945

Genus of beetles

Milatrogus is a genus of beetle of the family Scarabaeidae. It is monotypic, being represented by the single species, Milatrogus amphibolus, which is found in Morocco.

== Description ==
Adults reach a length of about 15–18 mm (0.59–0.71 in). They are yellowish-brown to more or less dark reddish-brown. The disc of the pronotum and of the elytra is glabrous. There are long hairs on the head, along the margins of the pronotum and the elytra.
