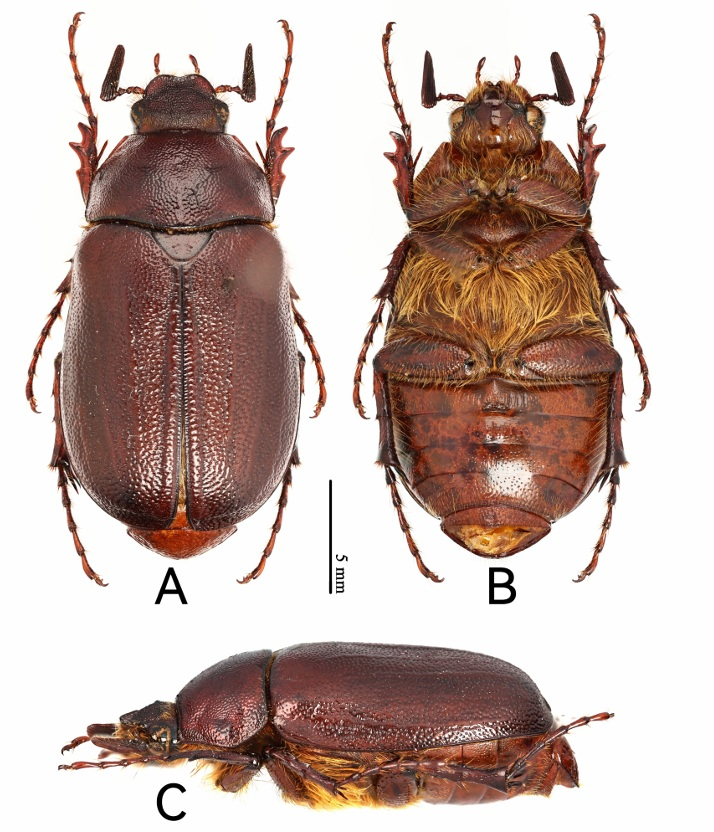

Scientific classification
- Kingdom: Animalia
- Phylum: Arthropoda
- Clade: Pancrustacea
- Class: Insecta
- Order: Coleoptera
- Suborder: Polyphaga
- Infraorder: Scarabaeiformia
- Family: Scarabaeidae
- Genus: Megistophylla
- Species: M. wangae

Binomial name
- Megistophylla wangae Zhang & Li, 2025

= Megistophylla wangae =

Species of beetle

Megistophylla wangae is a species of beetle of the Scarabaeidae family. This species is found in China (Hubei).

Adults reach a length of about 20.7 mm. They have a blackish-brown body.

== Etymology ==
The species is named after Ms. Xuan-Qi Wang (Xiangyang, China) who collected the holotype.
