= Brahmina jubata =

Scientific classification
- Kingdom: Animalia
- Phylum: Arthropoda
- Clade: Pancrustacea
- Class: Insecta
- Order: Coleoptera
- Suborder: Polyphaga
- Infraorder: Scarabaeiformia
- Family: Scarabaeidae
- Genus: Brahmina
- Species: B. jubata

Binomial name
- Brahmina jubata Frey, 1969

Species of beetle

Brahmina jubata is a species of beetle of the family Scarabaeidae. It is found in Nepal and China (Xizang).

== Description ==
Adults reach a length of about 13–14 mm. They are dark brown and shiny, with the ventral surface and the antennae lighter brown.
