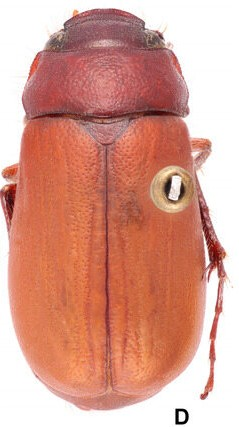

Scientific classification
- Kingdom: Animalia
- Phylum: Arthropoda
- Clade: Pancrustacea
- Class: Insecta
- Order: Coleoptera
- Suborder: Polyphaga
- Infraorder: Scarabaeiformia
- Family: Scarabaeidae
- Genus: Heptophylla
- Species: H. laticollis

Binomial name
- Heptophylla laticollis Zhang, 1995

= Heptophylla laticollis =

Species of beetle

Heptophylla laticollis is a species of beetle of the family Scarabaeidae. It is found in China (Zhejiang).
