= Amphitrichia tenuitibialis =

Scientific classification
- Kingdom: Animalia
- Phylum: Arthropoda
- Clade: Pancrustacea
- Class: Insecta
- Order: Coleoptera
- Suborder: Polyphaga
- Infraorder: Scarabaeiformia
- Family: Scarabaeidae
- Genus: Amphitrichia
- Species: A. tenuitibialis

Binomial name
- Amphitrichia tenuitibialis (Matsumoto, 2010)

Synonyms
- Holotrichia tenuitibialis Matsumoto, 2010

Species of beetle

Amphitrichia tenuitibialis is a species of beetle of the family Scarabaeidae. It is found in the Philippines (Mindoro).

== Description ==
Adults reach a length of about 15–17.2 mm (0.59–0.68 in). They have an almost dark blackish brown body with the head and pronotum blackish. The dorsal surface is opaque.

== Etymology ==
The species name refers to its slender protibia.
