= Maghrebotrogus hucheti =

Scientific classification
- Kingdom: Animalia
- Phylum: Arthropoda
- Clade: Pancrustacea
- Class: Insecta
- Order: Coleoptera
- Suborder: Polyphaga
- Infraorder: Scarabaeiformia
- Family: Scarabaeidae
- Genus: Maghrebotrogus
- Species: M. hucheti

Binomial name
- Maghrebotrogus hucheti Montreuil & Keith, 2022

Species of beetle

Maghrebotrogus hucheti is a species of beetle of the family Scarabaeidae. It is found in Morocco.

== Description ==
Adults reach a length of about 11–13 mm (0.43–0.51 in). They have a short and stocky, yellowish-brown to reddish-brown body, with the head and pronotum often darkened. The head, pronotum and scutellum are glabrous, while the elytra have very short hairs.

== Etymology ==
This species is dedicated to Jean-Bernard Huchet, a Scarabaeidae specialist.
