= Hilyotrogus sikkimensis =

Scientific classification
- Kingdom: Animalia
- Phylum: Arthropoda
- Clade: Pancrustacea
- Class: Insecta
- Order: Coleoptera
- Suborder: Polyphaga
- Infraorder: Scarabaeiformia
- Family: Scarabaeidae
- Genus: Hilyotrogus
- Species: H. sikkimensis

Binomial name
- Hilyotrogus sikkimensis Moser, 1913

Species of beetle

Hilyotrogus sikkimensis is a species of beetle of the family Scarabaeidae. It is found in India (Sikkim).

== Description ==
Adults reach a length of about 15 mm (0.59 in). They are similar to Hilyotrogus flavosericeus in coloration, but the head and pronotum are darker. The frons is extensively covered with strong punctures, which are fringed with erect yellowish hairs. On the clypeus, the punctures are closer together than on the frons and the anterior margin of the clypeus is weakly upturned and slightly emarginate. The pronotum is finely and rather sparsely punctured and the sides are rounded, the anterior angles not projecting, and the anterior and lateral margins are fringed with erect cilia. The scutellum bears sparse punctures. On the moderately densely punctured elytra, which are somewhat widened behind the middle, only the sutural rib and the second primary rib are more clearly marked. Both are only very sparsely punctured. The pygidium is weakly wrinkled. The thorax is covered with yellow hairs, and the abdomen almost smooth.
