= Hilyotrogus ochraceosericeus =

Scientific classification
- Kingdom: Animalia
- Phylum: Arthropoda
- Clade: Pancrustacea
- Class: Insecta
- Order: Coleoptera
- Suborder: Polyphaga
- Infraorder: Scarabaeiformia
- Family: Scarabaeidae
- Genus: Hilyotrogus
- Species: H. ochraceosericeus

Binomial name
- Hilyotrogus ochraceosericeus Moser, 1913

Species of beetle

Hilyotrogus ochraceosericeus is a species of beetle of the family Scarabaeidae. It is found in India (Assam).

== Description ==
Adults reach a length of about 18 mm (0.71 in). They are similar to Hilyotrogus flavosericeus, but has a different antennal structure, the frons is even more extensively punctate, and the clypeus is slightly longer. The punctation of the pronotum and elytra is finer. Otherwise, the two species are nearly identical.
