= Monotropus brancoi =

Scientific classification
- Kingdom: Animalia
- Phylum: Arthropoda
- Clade: Pancrustacea
- Class: Insecta
- Order: Coleoptera
- Suborder: Polyphaga
- Infraorder: Scarabaeiformia
- Family: Scarabaeidae
- Genus: Monotropus
- Species: M. brancoi

Binomial name
- Monotropus brancoi Baraud, 1979

Species of beetle

Monotropus brancoi is a species of beetle of the family Scarabaeidae. It is found in Portugal and Spain.
