= Rhizotrogini =

Scientific classification
- Kingdom: Animalia
- Phylum: Arthropoda
- Clade: Pancrustacea
- Class: Insecta
- Order: Coleoptera
- Suborder: Polyphaga
- Infraorder: Scarabaeiformia
- Family: Scarabaeidae
- Subfamily: Melolonthinae
- Tribe: Rhizotrogini; Burmeister, 1855

Synonyms
- Triodonina Rivera-Gasperín & Morón, 2013

Tribe of beetles

Rhizotrogini is a tribe of scarab beetles in the family Scarabaeidae.

== Subtribes and genera ==
- Rhizotrogina
  - Amadotrogus Reitter, 1902
  - Amphimallon Latreille, 1825
  - Bunbunius Nomura, 1970
  - Firminus Coca-Abia, 2003
  - Geotrogus Guérin-Méneville, 1842
  - Glacilitarsus Matsumoto, 2014
  - Maghrebotrogus Montreuil & Keith, 2022
  - Milatrogus Montreuil & Keith, 2022
  - Miridiba Reitter, 1902
  - Monotropus Erichson, 1847
  - Nigrotrichia Matsumoto, 2016
  - Paraholotrichia Lacroix & Coache, 2017
  - Pedinotrichia Matsumoto, 2016
  - Phyllophaga Harris, 1826
  - Pollaplonyx Waterhouse, 1875
  - Rhizotrogus Latreille, 1825
  - Rufotrichia Matsumoto, 2016
  - Siamophylla Keith, 2005
  - Testaceitrichia Matsumoto, 2021
  - Tosevskiana Pavićević, 1985
- Unplaced
  - Aethiaratrogus Decelle, 1982
  - Amphitrichia Brenske, 1894
  - Anomalochela Moser, 1913
  - Aplidia Hope, 1837
  - Asaphomorpha Brancsik, 1893
  - Asophrops Petrovitz, 1961
  - Brachyllus Brenske, 1896
  - Brahmina Blanchard, 1851
  - Butozania Mikšić, 1955
  - Catrachia Coca-Abia & Robbins, 2006
  - Cheberdord Allsopp, 2025
  - Chilotrogus Reitter, 1905
  - Chioneosoma Kraatz, 1891
  - Chlaenobia Blanchard, 1850
  - Dasytrogus Reitter, 1902
  - Dinamoraza Lacroix, 1989
  - Dinarobina Lacroix, 1989
  - Eotrichia Medvedev, 1951
  - Eremotrogus Kolbe, 1914
  - Gymnogaster Blanchard, 1851
  - Holochelus Reitter, 1889
  - Holotrichia Hope, 1837
  - Hoplochelus Blanchard, 1851
  - Iranotrogus Nikolajev, 2006
  - Lachnota Reitter, 1889
  - Lasiexis Semenov & Medvedev, 1936
  - Lasiopsis Erichson, 1847
  - Lasiotropus Reitter, 1913
  - Latipalpus Moser, 1921
  - Listrochelus Blanchard, 1851
  - Madiniella Chalumeau & Gruner, 1976
  - Mascarena Arrow, 1919
  - Medeotrogus Keith, 2001
  - Megistophylla Burmeister, 1855
  - Onychosophrops Frey, 1972
  - Panotrogus Reitter, 1902
  - Pectinichelus Ballion, 1871
  - Pseudopanotrogus Petrovitz, 1969
  - Pseudotrematodes Jacquelin Du Val, 1859
  - Sophrops Fairmaire, 1887
  - Stenosophrops Nomura, 1977
  - Trematodes Faldermann, 1835
  - Trichesthes Erichson, 1847
  - Triodonyx Saylor, 1942
  - Xanthotrogus Reitter, 1902
  - Xestotrogus Reitter, 1902
