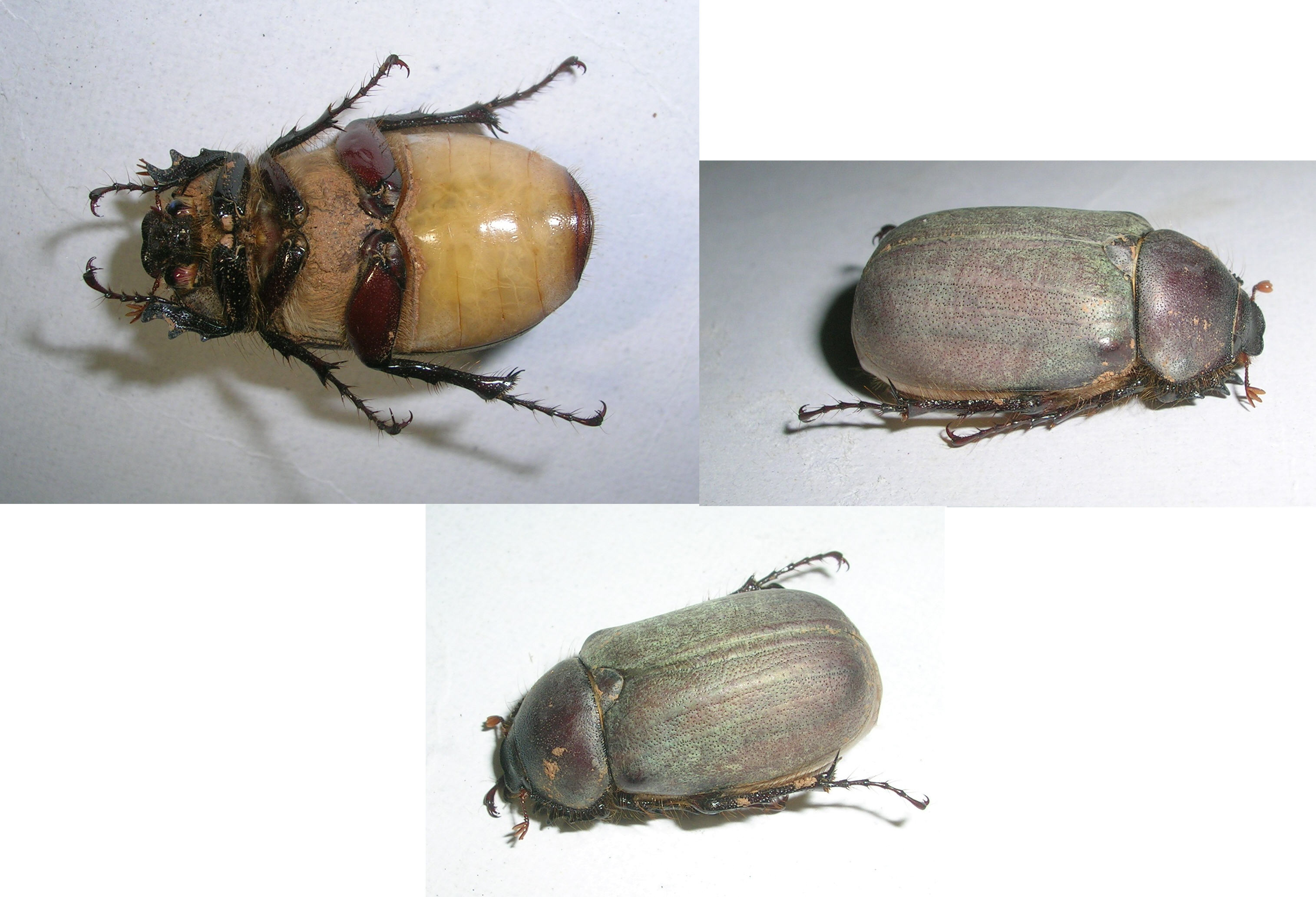
- Holotrichia species (possibly H. reynaudi)

Scientific classification
- Kingdom: Animalia
- Phylum: Arthropoda
- Clade: Pancrustacea
- Class: Insecta
- Order: Coleoptera
- Suborder: Polyphaga
- Infraorder: Scarabaeiformia
- Family: Scarabaeidae
- Subfamily: Melolonthinae
- Tribe: Melolonthini
- Genus: Holotrichia; Hope, 1837

Species
- Many species

= Holotrichia =

Genus of beetles

Holotrichia is a genus of beetle in the family Scarabaeidae, which are well known as "chafer beetles" or "white-grubs" for their white larvae that are found under the soil where they feed on the roots of plants.

Particularly well known species include Holotrichia serrata which is a serious problem in sugarcane cultivation and Holotrichia consanguinea which is a problem in groundnut cultivation. Holotrichia parallela is known as the "dark/large black chafer" or "Asian cockchafer" and is a serious agricultural pest of sweet potato, peanut and soybean crops in China.

== List of species ==
- H. acuticollis
- H. akolana
- H. amamiana
- H. andamana
- H. andrewesi
- H. anthracina
- H. aritai
- H. atkinsoni
- H. barbata
- H. behrensi
- H. bengalensis
- H. bhutanensis
- H. bicolorata
- H. brenskeiana
- H. brunneipennis
- H. burmanica
- H. calliglypta
- H. canlaonensis
- H. carinata
- H. carmelita
- H. ceylonensis
- H. cochinchina
- H. consanguinea
- H. convexifrons
- H. convexopyga
- H. costulata
- H. dalatensis
- H. danielssoni
- H. danjoensis
- H. dannymohagani
- H. deliana
- H. deplanata
- H. desiderata
- H. diomphalia
- H. disparilis
- H. dohrni
- H. dolini
- H. dorsalis
- H. dubiosa
- H. ebentera
- H. egregia
- H. ernesti
- H. farinosa
- H. fissa
- H. freyi
- H. furcifer
- H. gaoligongshanica
- H. gebleri
- H. geilenkeuseri
- H. glabriclypeata
- H. glabrifrons
- H. gressitti
- H. guandaoshana
- H. hankowiensis
- H. helleri
- H. herwangshana
- H. heterodactyla
- H. heterotincta
- H. hirsuta
- H. holovestita
- H. horishana
- H. inducta
- H. insecata
- H. intermedia
- H. intersa
- H. iridescens
- H. iridipennis
- H. kanarana
- H. kandulawai
- H. karschi
- H. kaszabi
- H. kiotonensis
- H. koraiensis
- H. kulzeri
- H. kunmina
- H. kwatungensis
- H. laevigata
- H. langeri
- H. lata
- H. laticeps
- H. liukueinsis
- H. longicarinata
- H. longilamellata
- H. longiuscula
- H. loochooana
- H. luangia
- H. madurensis
- H. magna
- H. marginicollis
- H. mausonia
- H. mizusawai
- H. montana
- H. montivaga
- H. mucida
- H. murzini
- H. nagpurensis
- H. nathani
- H. nicobarica
- H. nigrescens
- H. nigricollis
- H. nigrofusca
- H. nilgiria
- H. nilgirina
- H. notaticollis
- H. nubiliventris
- H. oblita
- H. obscura
- H. occipitalis
- H. ochrogaster
- H. omeia
- H. opacipennis
- H. opuana
- H. ovata
- H. pagana
- H. parallela
- H. parva
- H. parvioculata
- H. perotteti
- H. picea
- H. pilifrons
- H. pilipyga
- H. pinguis
- H. plagiata
- H. planipennis
- H. plumbea
- H. problematica
- H. pruinosella
- H. pruinosipennis
- H. pubifemorata
- H. pulvinosa
- H. pygidialis
- H. quinquefoliata
- H. remorata
- H. repetita
- H. reynaudi
- H. richteri
- H. rosettae
- H. rotundiceps
- H. rubida
- H. rufescens
- H. rufina
- H. rufodorsalis
- H. rufoflava
- H. rufofulva
- H. rufula
- H. rufus
- H. rugans
- H. rugaticollis
- H. rugatifrons
- H. rugifrons
- H. rustica
- H. sakuraii
- H. sauteri
- H. schereri
- H. schmitzi
- H. sculpticollis
- H. sculptifrons
- H. scutata
- H. scutulata
- H. semihirta
- H. semiserrata
- H. semitomentosa
- H. senegalensis
- H. serrata
- H. serraticollis
- H. seticollis
- H. setiventris
- H. setosa
- H. severini
- H. sharpi
- H. shibatai
- H. shishona
- H. siamensis
- H. sichotana
- H. signatifrons
- H. sikkimana
- H. similis
- H. simillima
- H. sjoestedti
- H. sororia
- H. subrugipennis
- H. sumatrana
- H. szechuanensis
- H. teinzoana
- H. tenasserima
- H. tetarana
- H. tjibodasia
- H. tokara
- H. truncata
- H. tuberculata
- H. umbrata
- H. undulata
- H. ungulata
- H. vernicata
- H. vethi
- H. vietnamensis
- H. wangerbaoensis
- H. weyersi
- H. wiebesi
- H. yamayai
- H. yui
- H. yunnana
