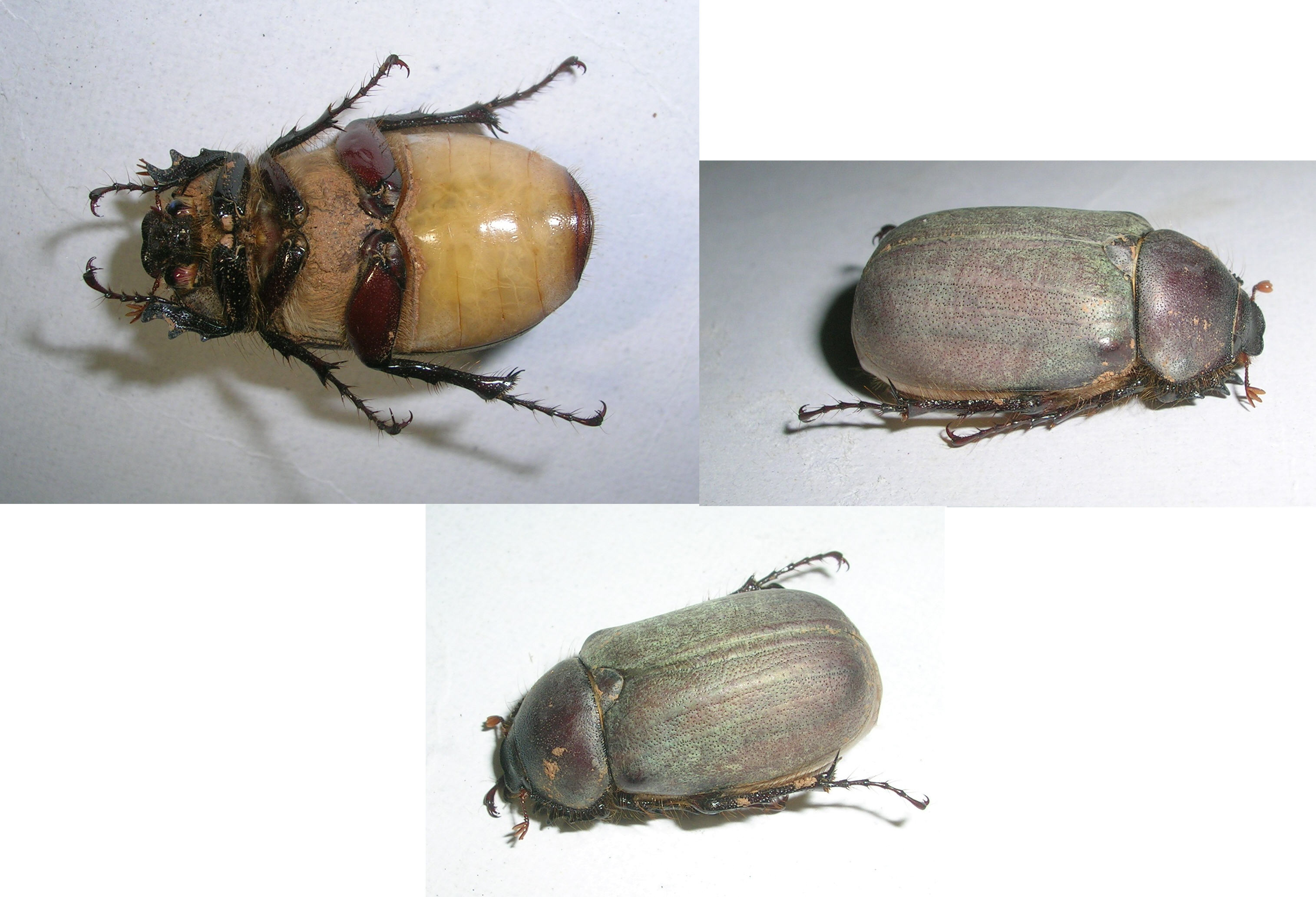

Scientific classification
- Kingdom: Animalia
- Phylum: Arthropoda
- Class: Insecta
- Order: Coleoptera
- Suborder: Polyphaga
- Infraorder: Scarabaeiformia
- Family: Scarabaeidae
- Genus: Holotrichia
- Species: H. reynaudi

Binomial name
- Holotrichia reynaudi (Blanchard, 1851)

Synonyms
- Ancylonycha reynaudi Blanchard, 1850; Holotrichia insularis Brenske, 1894; Holotrichia reynaudi Dallatorre, 1912; Holotrichia reynaudi Frey, 1971

= Holotrichia reynaudi =

Species of beetle

Holotrichia reynaudi is a species of dung beetle found in South India and Sri Lanka.

== Biology ==
It is a medium-sized beetle closely resemble Holotrichia akolana. The total life cycle of the species is about 112 to 116 days in captivity.

The male attractant pheromone, anisole was identified from abdominal glands of females. Anisole is also the sex pheromone of Holotrichia consanguinea, making the first known example of two melolonthine scarabs sharing the same pheromone.

=== Eggs ===
Female lays eggs singly in the moist loose soil which is about 5 to 10 cm in depth during early hours of day time. The period of egg laying continued for 8 to 10 days with a 3 to 5 days gap between two egg laying days. Freshly laid egg are pearly white in color. Eggs are oval and measured on an average of 2.99 mm in length. Before hatching, they become more spherical. The maximum incubation period is about 11.75 days under laboratory conditions.

=== Grub ===
Just after hatching, grub is creamy white in color, with a light brown head. However, after few hours, it becomes dark brown and grubs became active in about 3.5 to 5 hours. First instar feed on the organic matter which is about an average of 14.86 mm in length. Average duration of first instar is about 15 to 16 days in captivity. Second instar becomes dirty white in color, with swollen and darker abdominal segments. Average length is about 21.62mm with an average grub period is 17.5 days in captivity. The third instar has same color as second instar and is the active root feeder, with strong mandibles. Thoracic segments are distinct. Fore legs shorter, and hind legs longer. Average length is 40.65 mm. The average duration is 34 days in captivity. Therefore, the total grub period from first instar to third instar is roughly about 66.0 to 67.38 days.

=== Pupa ===
Full grown third instar gradually burrows deep into the soil to start pupation. It is known to prepare a small earthen cell in a semi-circular fashion and pupated within that cell, otherwise it cannot survive when any damage occur to the cell. This exarate pupa is about 21.29 mm in length. The pupal period is about 17.06 days under captivity.

=== Adult ===
During the October and November months, adults start to emerge from the pupa. Freshly adult male is brick red in color but gradually becomes dark brown within four to five weeks. They show slight sexual dimorphism in size where male is slightly smaller than the females and presence of pointed hind tibial spur. Average length of male in captivity is about 20.0 mm. Adult male is known to live about 16 to 20 days in captivity. Female is similar to male with coloration. Female has broad hind tibial spur. Average length is about 21.51 mm and known to live about 17 to 22 days under captivity.

Elytra pruinose, and appendages reddish brown. Antenna 10 segmented with 3 clubbed segments. In the 1st segment, there are elongated, ventral fringes of hairs. Clypeus shorter than frons. Anterior angle of pronotum shapely acute. Pronotum uniformly and deeply punctate. Legs punctate, and setaceous with whitish elongated setae. Fore tibia tridentate, with toothed claws. Scutellum uniformly, and feebly punctate. Pygidium finely punctate, with broad tip. Male genitalia consists of a broad Phallobase.

== Control ==
It is a major pest on Arachis hypogaea in India. The species can be eradicate from peanut cultivation with many insecticides such as imidacloprid, chlorantraniliprole, and fipronil.
