= Sophrops brunneus =

Scientific classification
- Kingdom: Animalia
- Phylum: Arthropoda
- Clade: Pancrustacea
- Class: Insecta
- Order: Coleoptera
- Suborder: Polyphaga
- Infraorder: Scarabaeiformia
- Family: Scarabaeidae
- Genus: Sophrops
- Species: S. brunneus

Binomial name
- Sophrops brunneus (Moser, 1915)

Synonyms
- Microtrichia brunnea Moser, 1915

Species of beetle

Sophrops brunneus is a species of beetle of the family Scarabaeidae. It is found in China (Yunnan), Laos and Thailand.

== Description ==
Adults reach a length of about 16 mm (0.63 in). They are similar to Sophrops chinensis and Sophrops sericeicollis, but differs from both in the formation of its claws. The inner claw tooth does not taper gradually towards the tip, but is obliquely truncated, so that it appears strongly curved. The sculpture of the pronotum and elytra is similar to that of S. sericeicollis. Unlike S. chinensis and S. sericeicollis, the punctures on the posterior half of the metasternum bear erect setae.
