= Sophrops laticeps =

Scientific classification
- Kingdom: Animalia
- Phylum: Arthropoda
- Clade: Pancrustacea
- Class: Insecta
- Order: Coleoptera
- Suborder: Polyphaga
- Infraorder: Scarabaeiformia
- Family: Scarabaeidae
- Genus: Sophrops
- Species: S. laticeps

Binomial name
- Sophrops laticeps (Moser, 1913)

Synonyms
- Microtrichia laticeps Moser, 1913

Species of beetle

Sophrops laticeps is a species of beetle of the family Scarabaeidae. It is found in Indonesia (Java).

== Description ==
Adults reach a length of about 15 mm (0.59 in). They are similar to Sophrops rugulosus, but distinguished by a different formation of the clypeus. The head is coarsely and densely punctate, the clypeus broadens from the base to the middle, its anterior angles are rounded, its anterior margin is arcuately emarginate. The pronotum is moderately densely, rather strongly punctate, the lateral margins are very weakly crenate, and there is a weak marginal ridge on both sides of the posterior margin. The scutellum is sparsely punctate. The elytra are weakly wrinkled, umbilicately punctate, and the ribs are weakly prominent. The pygidium is moderately densely covered with umbilicate punctures, and a narrow anterior margin is dull. The punctation of the underside is fine and sparse. On the sides, scattered spots bear short setae and the penultimate abdominal segment shows fine, thin hairs.
