= Holotrichia marginicollis =

Scientific classification
- Kingdom: Animalia
- Phylum: Arthropoda
- Clade: Pancrustacea
- Class: Insecta
- Order: Coleoptera
- Suborder: Polyphaga
- Infraorder: Scarabaeiformia
- Family: Scarabaeidae
- Tribe: Melolonthini
- Genus: Holotrichia
- Species: H. marginicollis

Binomial name
- Holotrichia marginicollis Frey, 1970

Species of beetle

Holotrichia marginicollis is a species of beetle of the family Scarabaeidae. It is found in Vietnam.

== Description ==
Adults reach a length of about 23 mm (0.91 in). The head is blackish and faintly glossy, while the pronotum is dark brown and strongly tomentose. The elytra are brown, slightly tomentose and dull. The underside is brown and moderately glossy and the pygidium is brown and dull.
