= Sophrops schereri =

Scientific classification
- Kingdom: Animalia
- Phylum: Arthropoda
- Clade: Pancrustacea
- Class: Insecta
- Order: Coleoptera
- Suborder: Polyphaga
- Infraorder: Scarabaeiformia
- Family: Scarabaeidae
- Genus: Sophrops
- Species: S. schereri

Binomial name
- Sophrops schereri Frey, 1975

Species of beetle

Sophrops schereri is a species of beetle of the family Scarabaeidae. It is found in Indonesia (Sumatra).

== Description ==
Adults reach a length of about 10 mm. The upper and lower surfaces are dark reddish-brown, with the upper surface only slightly glossy. There are a few hairs at the tip of the pygidium, but the upper surface is otherwise glabrous. The underside, middle of the thorax and ventral segments are shiny, the sides dull and tomentose. The non-tomentose parts of the underside are reddish-brown and moderately densely punctate. The legs are also reddish-brown.
