= Holotrichia schereri =

Scientific classification
- Kingdom: Animalia
- Phylum: Arthropoda
- Clade: Pancrustacea
- Class: Insecta
- Order: Coleoptera
- Suborder: Polyphaga
- Infraorder: Scarabaeiformia
- Family: Scarabaeidae
- Tribe: Melolonthini
- Genus: Holotrichia
- Species: H. schereri

Binomial name
- Holotrichia schereri Frey, 1970

Species of beetle

Holotrichia schereri is a species of beetle of the family Scarabaeidae. It is found in Malaysia.

== Description ==
Adults reach a length of about 23 mm (0.91 in). The upper surface is dark brown, while the underside is brown and faintly glossy. The upper surface is glabrous. The lateral margins of the pronotum and elytra are very sparsely pubescent, while the underside of the thorax has long, shaggy pubescence. The entire abdomen glabrous, as is the pygidium, which is only slightly ciliated on the lower margin.
