= Holotrichia cochinchina =

Scientific classification
- Kingdom: Animalia
- Phylum: Arthropoda
- Clade: Pancrustacea
- Class: Insecta
- Order: Coleoptera
- Suborder: Polyphaga
- Infraorder: Scarabaeiformia
- Family: Scarabaeidae
- Tribe: Melolonthini
- Genus: Holotrichia
- Species: H. cochinchina

Binomial name
- Holotrichia cochinchina (Nonfried, 1891)

Synonyms
- Ancylonycha cochinchinae Nonfried, 1891; Holotrichia moseri Arrow, 1944; Lachnosterna pinguis Fairmaire, 1904; Autoserica cochinchinae Brenske, 1899

Species of beetle

Holotrichia cochinchina is a species of beetle of the family Scarabaeidae. It is found in China (Guangxi, Guizhou, Sichuan, Yunnan), Cambodia, Laos and Vietnam.

== Description ==
Adults reach a length of about 6.5–7 mm. They are dull and brown, with a slight opalescent sheen (especially underneath). The clypeus is broad, angular with straight sides and very weakly rounded corners, densely and coarsely, wrinkledly punctate, with a faint longitudinal elevation in the middle, which is still indicated as a faint, unpunctate line on the frons. This is more finely punctate and as densely punctate as the pronotum. The pronotum is less transversely weakly rounded at the sides with sharp posterior angles. The anterior margin is not projected in the middle, and the punctures contain minute hairs. The scutellum is small and broad. The elytra are broadly and shallowly striated. A dense row of punctures is present in the striae. The broad interstices are sparsely punctate and minutely hairy. The pygidium is weakly pointed and dull, but quite densely punctate.
