= Holotrichia rotundiceps =

Scientific classification
- Kingdom: Animalia
- Phylum: Arthropoda
- Clade: Pancrustacea
- Class: Insecta
- Order: Coleoptera
- Suborder: Polyphaga
- Infraorder: Scarabaeiformia
- Family: Scarabaeidae
- Tribe: Melolonthini
- Genus: Holotrichia
- Species: H. rotundiceps

Binomial name
- Holotrichia rotundiceps Moser, 1913

Species of beetle

Holotrichia rotundiceps is a species of beetle of the family Scarabaeidae. It is found in Myanmar.

== Description ==
Adults reach a length of about 20 mm (0.79 in). They are reddish-brown, with the head and pronotum somewhat darker. The upper surface is pruinose. The head is coarsely, almost wrinkled, punctured. The clypeus is arched. The antennae are reddish-brown. The pronotum is widely and finely punctured, and the lateral margins are notched and fringed with yellow hairs. On the scutellum, there are two rows of punctures on each side next to the margin. Otherwise, only a few scattered punctures are visible, while the center of the scutellum is without punctures. On the elytra, the punctures are only slightly denser than on the pronotum and are somewhat coarser. The more widely punctate ribs are only faintly visible. The umbilical punctures of the pygidium are somewhat more densely spaced than on the elytra and the thorax is covered with greyish-yellow hairs.
