= Holotrichia serrata =

Scientific classification
- Kingdom: Animalia
- Phylum: Arthropoda
- Clade: Pancrustacea
- Class: Insecta
- Order: Coleoptera
- Suborder: Polyphaga
- Infraorder: Scarabaeiformia
- Family: Scarabaeidae
- Tribe: Melolonthini
- Genus: Holotrichia
- Species: H. serrata

Binomial name
- Holotrichia serrata (Fabricius, 1781)

Synonyms
- Lachnosterna serrata (Fabricius); Melolontha serrata Fabricius, 1781; Phyllophaga serrata (Fabricius); Holotrichia ceylonensis Moser, 1912; Holotrichia serraticollis Moser, 1912; Neolepidiota obscura Blackburn, 1890

Beetle species

Holotrichia serrata, commonly known as the sugarcane white grub, or cockchafer grub, is a species of dung beetle found in India (Andhra Pradesh, Assam, Haryana, Maharashtra, Mizoram, West Bengal, Uttar Pradesh, West Bengal, Himachal Pradesh, Sikkim), Bangladesh, and Sri Lanka.

== Description ==
Adult female beetles lay white, almost round eggs. The first and second instars are translucent, whitish-yellow with a characteristic 'C' – shape. The third instar is a dirty white color with an average length of about 34 to 39 mm. The clearly marked brownish-orange colored head consists of strong mandibles. Slender antennae are long and brown. The instar period lasts for 60 to 70 days, and is followed by a short pre-pupal period of two days. Pupation is within an earthen chamber where the third instar burrowed deep into the soil and prepared a small earthen cell. This exarate pupa is about 25 to 27 mm in length where the pupal period is 13 to 19 days. After the onset of rain, beetles emerge within 3 to 4 days. Adult beetles are brown in color where females are larger than males with an average length about 23 to 25 mm. Adults can survive for 12 to 26 days in captivity.

== Biology ==
The grub stage is considered as a serious pest on sugarcane where they can be controlled by management of using cultural, mechanical, biological, chemical and integrated methods. In biological method, grubs can be destroy by using the parasitoid fungus Metarhizium anisopliae. Apart from that, many insecticides such as chlorpyrifos, phorate, quinalphos and carbofuran also used for eradication of grubs in sugarcane cultivation. In September 2012, an outbreak of the beetle was recorded from soybean, cotton and pigeon pea ecosystems in Vidarbha, India.

Apart from sugarcane, it is also a major pest on many vegetables, groundnut and coconut. The volatiles from Acacia nilotica, Azadirachta indica leaf extract is known to elicited higher antennal response of adult beetles. Usually this antennal response to pheromone gland and host extracts is higher in males. Grubs are also known to parasitized by another entomopathogenic fungus Beauveria brongniartii. In Sri Lanka, grubs have been observed to feed on the tap roots of the teak seedlings, and finally the damaged plants wilt and die. Grubs also can be removed from the cultivation land by cultural practises such as ploughing, harrowing, hoeing, flooding and fallowing of fields, trap cropping and crop rotation. Other than that, resistant crops such as sunflower and trap crops such as sorghum, maize, onion can be grown along with the cultivation.

In 2009, many rice, chillies, sorghum and sugarcane cultivations in Maharashtra State, about 9,000,000 adult beetles were collected mechanically and destroyed after heavy infestations. Also Acacia arabica and neem tree extracts mixed with DDT also used for eradication. Apart from that, the bacterium Paenibacillus popilliae and some entomopathogenic nematodes such as Heterorhabditis indica, Heterorhabditis bacteriophora, Steinernema glaseri and Steinernema riobrave can be used against pupae and adult beetles. The seed extract from Datura innoxia and Thevetia peruviana also show biopesticide properties against grubs.

=== Main host plants ===
- Areca catechu
- Arachis hypogaea
- Cajanus cajan
- Cocos nucifera
- Gossypium arboreum
- Hevea brasiliensis
- Nicotiana tabacum
- Oryza sativa
- Pennisetum glaucum
- Saccharum officinarum
- Solanum tuberosum
- Sorghum bicolor
- Tectona grandis
