= Rufotrichia sororia =

Scientific classification
- Kingdom: Animalia
- Phylum: Arthropoda
- Clade: Pancrustacea
- Class: Insecta
- Order: Coleoptera
- Suborder: Polyphaga
- Infraorder: Scarabaeiformia
- Family: Scarabaeidae
- Genus: Rufotrichia
- Species: R. sororia

Binomial name
- Rufotrichia sororia (Moser, 1912)

Synonyms
- Holotrichia sororia Moser, 1912; Phyllophaga haberosa Saylor, 1937

Species of beetle

Rufotrichia sororia is a species of beetle of the family Scarabaeidae. It is found in Vietnam.

== Description ==
Adults reach a length of about 21 mm (0.83 in). They are very similar to Rufotrichia rufula, but somewhat darker in colour, and differs in the sculpture of the pygidium. The head and pronotum are blackish and the elytra brown with a violet sheen. The head is strongly punctate, with the clypeus somewhat wrinkled. Its margin is slightly upturned, and the anterior margin is emarginate in the middle. The antennae are yellowish-brown. The pronotum is shaped similarly to R. rufula, but not as densely punctate and the sculpture of the scutellum and elytra is also similar to that of R. rufula. While the pygidium in the latter species is quite densely covered with umbilical punctures, in R. sororia it is only very sparsely punctate.
