= Holotrichia disparilis =

Scientific classification
- Kingdom: Animalia
- Phylum: Arthropoda
- Clade: Pancrustacea
- Class: Insecta
- Order: Coleoptera
- Suborder: Polyphaga
- Infraorder: Scarabaeiformia
- Family: Scarabaeidae
- Tribe: Melolonthini
- Genus: Holotrichia
- Species: H. disparilis

Binomial name
- Holotrichia disparilis Arrow, 1916

Species of beetle

Holotrichia disparilis is a species of chafer found in Sri Lanka.

== Biology ==
It is a major pest of Camellia sinensis particularly in nursery and seedling stages where they mainly attack roots. Disease symptoms are yellowed or dead leaves, reduced root system and finally dieback of the whole plant. White grubs mainly affect young tea plants. During dry weather, roots are infested with large number of grubs and leave calloused stumps. They also feeds on the bark at soil level which can be seen as ring-barking of the stem. In Sri Lanka, damage occurs mainly during June to August or from November to December in north-eastern and south-western monsoonal zones. About 80-90% of grubs can be collected by hand picking method to control the pest attack.
