= Holotrichia rugatifrons =

Scientific classification
- Kingdom: Animalia
- Phylum: Arthropoda
- Clade: Pancrustacea
- Class: Insecta
- Order: Coleoptera
- Suborder: Polyphaga
- Infraorder: Scarabaeiformia
- Family: Scarabaeidae
- Tribe: Melolonthini
- Genus: Holotrichia
- Species: H. rugatifrons

Binomial name
- Holotrichia rugatifrons Frey, 1970

Species of beetle

Holotrichia rugatifrons is a species of beetle of the family Scarabaeidae. It is found in Vietnam.

== Description ==
Adults reach a length of about 19–20 mm (0.75–0.79 in). The upper surface is dark brown, dull and pruinose, while the underside is lighter brown, with only the ventral segments slightly pruinose. The pronotum and elytra are very sparsely fringed with pale cilia.
