= Nigrotrichia =

Scientific classification
- Kingdom: Animalia
- Phylum: Arthropoda
- Clade: Pancrustacea
- Class: Insecta
- Order: Coleoptera
- Suborder: Polyphaga
- Infraorder: Scarabaeiformia
- Family: Scarabaeidae
- Subfamily: Melolonthinae
- Tribe: Rhizotrogini
- Genus: Nigrotrichia; Matsumoto, 2016

Genus of beetles

Nigrotrichia is a genus of beetles belonging to the family Scarabaeidae.

== Species ==
- Nigrotrichia amamiana (Nomura, 1964)
- Nigrotrichia anthracina (Brenske, 1892)
- Nigrotrichia convexopyga (Moser, 1912)
- Nigrotrichia danjoensis (Miyake & Imasaka, 1982)
- Nigrotrichia ernesti (Reitter, 1902)
- Nigrotrichia gebleri (Faldermann, 1835)
- Nigrotrichia kiotonensis (Brenske, 1894)
- Nigrotrichia loochooana (Sawada, 1950)
- Nigrotrichia miyakoana Matsumoto, 2022
- Nigrotrichia opacipennis (Moser, 1912)
- Nigrotrichia pygidialis (Brenske, 1892)
- Nigrotrichia sauteri (Moser, 1912)
- Nigrotrichia siamensis (Frey, 1970)
- Nigrotrichia tokara (Nakane, 1956)
- Nigrotrichia truncata (Zhang, 1965)
