= Sophrops =

Scientific classification
- Kingdom: Animalia
- Phylum: Arthropoda
- Clade: Pancrustacea
- Class: Insecta
- Order: Coleoptera
- Suborder: Polyphaga
- Infraorder: Scarabaeiformia
- Family: Scarabaeidae
- Subfamily: Melolonthinae
- Tribe: Rhizotrogini
- Genus: Sophrops; Fairmaire, 1887

Synonyms
- Holotrichia (Eretusa) Reitter, 1902; Holotrichia (Noanda) Reitter, 1902; Microtrichia Brenske, 1900

Genus of leaf beetles

Sophrops is a genus of beetles belonging to the family Scarabaeidae.

== Species ==
- Sophrops abscessus (Brenske, 1892)
- Sophrops acalcarius Gu & Zhang, 1996
- Sophrops acutangularis (Moser, 1918)
- Sophrops analesetalis Gu & Zhang, 1992
- Sophrops andamanus (Brenske, 1899)
- Sophrops arrowi Frey, 1973
- Sophrops assamensis (Moser, 1913)
- Sophrops basicollis Arrow, 1946
- Sophrops bifenestratus Arrow, 1946
- Sophrops bituberculatus (Moser, 1908)
- Sophrops brevisetalis Gu & Zhang, 1992
- Sophrops brunneus (Moser, 1915)
- Sophrops burmanicus (Moser, 1913)
- Sophrops buruensis (Brenske, 1892)
- Sophrops cantonensis Petrovitz, 1969
- Sophrops cardoni (Brenske, 1892)
- Sophrops cephalotes (Burmeister, 1855)
- Sophrops chinensis (Brenske, 1892)
- Sophrops coronarius Gu & Zhang, 1992
- Sophrops costatus (Walker, 1859)
- Sophrops cotesi (Brenske, 1892)
- Sophrops cribripennis (Brenske, 1892)
- Sophrops defreinai Frey, 1973
- Sophrops deliensis (Moser, 1917)
- Sophrops densatus Frey, 1971
- Sophrops dorsalis (Frey, 1969)
- Sophrops egregius (Moser, 1912)
- Sophrops eurystomus (Burmeister, 1855)
- Sophrops excisus Itoh, 1994
- Sophrops flabellatus (Brenske, 1892)
- Sophrops formosanus (Moser, 1913)
- Sophrops foveatus (Moser, 1909)
- Sophrops furcifer (Arrow, 1916)
- Sophrops hauseri Balthasar, 1932
- Sophrops heteropygus (Moser, 1913)
- Sophrops heydeni (Brenske, 1892)
- Sophrops himalayicus (Brenske, 1892)
- Sophrops impressicollis (Moser, 1913)
- Sophrops iridescens (Moser, 1908)
- Sophrops iridipennis (Brenske, 1892)
- Sophrops irregularis Arrow, 1946
- Sophrops kanarana (Moser, 1918)
- Sophrops karschi (Brenske, 1892)
- Sophrops kaszabi (Frey, 1972)
- Sophrops kawadai (Nomura, 1959)
- Sophrops keralensis Frey, 1973
- Sophrops konishii Nomura, 1970
- Sophrops laticeps (Moser, 1913)
- Sophrops latiusculus Nomura, 1977
- Sophrops latus Frey, 1972
- Sophrops longicarinatus (Brenske, 1892)
- Sophrops longiflabella Gu & Zhang, 1995
- Sophrops luangia (Moser, 1912)
- Sophrops luridipennis (Moser, 1915)
- Sophrops microphyllus (Brenske, 1892)
- Sophrops mindanaoensis (Moser, 1924)
- Sophrops montivagus (Moser, 1915)
- Sophrops nigrofuscus (Moser, 1921)
- Sophrops nilgirinus (Moser, 1913)
- Sophrops nubiliventris (Bates, 1891)
- Sophrops nudus (Moser, 1915)
- Sophrops obscurus (Brenske, 1892)
- Sophrops opacidorsalis Itoh, 1994
- Sophrops pallidus Itoh, 1994
- Sophrops parviceps Fairmaire, 1887
- Sophrops paucisetosus Frey, 1971
- Sophrops peronosporus Gu & Zhang, 1992
- Sophrops pexicollis (Fairmaire, 1886)
- Sophrops planicollis (Burmeister, 1855)
- Sophrops planipennis (Moser, 1913)
- Sophrops problematicus (Brenske, 1899)
- Sophrops promeanus (Moser, 1918)
- Sophrops pruinosipennis (Moser, 1915)
- Sophrops pruinosipyga Gu & Zhang, 1996
- Sophrops pseudoplanicollis Matsumoto, 2020
- Sophrops pubiventris (Burmeister, 1855)
- Sophrops pumilus (Sharp, 1881)
- Sophrops purkynei Balthasar, 1932
- Sophrops reticulata Frey, 1969
- Sophrops roeri Frey, 1972
- Sophrops rotundicollis Itoh, 1994
- Sophrops rufofulvus (Moser, 1919)
- Sophrops rugatus (Moser, 1915)
- Sophrops rugifrons (Moser, 1918)
- Sophrops rugipennis (Frey, 1972)
- Sophrops rugulosus (Brenske, 1892)
- Sophrops schereri Frey, 1975
- Sophrops sculpticollis (Blanchard, 1851)
- Sophrops semiserratus (Brenske, 1894)
- Sophrops semitomentosus (Frey, 1975)
- Sophrops sericeicollis (Moser, 1915)
- Sophrops setosus (Brenske, 1892)
- Sophrops sharpi (Brenske, 1892)
- Sophrops shillongensis (Brenske, 1899)
- Sophrops siamensis (Brenske, 1892)
- Sophrops signatifrons (Moser, 1913)
- Sophrops similis Arrow, 1946
- Sophrops simplex Frey, 1971
- Sophrops singhalensis (Brenske, 1892)
- Sophrops sjostedti (Moser, 1921)
- Sophrops standfussi (Brenske, 1892)
- Sophrops stenocorpus Gu & Zhang, 1996
- Sophrops striatus (Brenske, 1892)
- Sophrops subrugatus (Moser, 1921)
- Sophrops subrugipennis (Moser, 1921)
- Sophrops subrugosus (Moser, 1915)
- Sophrops sumatrensis (Brenske, 1892)
- Sophrops taiwanus Nomura, 1977
- Sophrops takatoshii Itoh, 1989
- Sophrops tavoyensis (Brenske, 1892)
- Sophrops teinzoanus (Moser, 1918)
- Sophrops thoracicus (Brenske, 1892)
- Sophrops tonkinensis (Moser, 1908)
- Sophrops umbilicatus Frey, 1973
- Sophrops vethi (Moser, 1914)
- Sophrops yangbiensis Gu & Zhang, 1996
