= Sophrops montivagus =

Scientific classification
- Kingdom: Animalia
- Phylum: Arthropoda
- Clade: Pancrustacea
- Class: Insecta
- Order: Coleoptera
- Suborder: Polyphaga
- Infraorder: Scarabaeiformia
- Family: Scarabaeidae
- Genus: Sophrops
- Species: S. montivagus

Binomial name
- Sophrops montivagus (Moser, 1915)

Synonyms
- Microtrichia montivaga Moser, 1915

Species of beetle

Sophrops montivagus is a species of beetle of the family Scarabaeidae. It is found in Vietnam.

== Description ==
Adults reach a length of about 12 mm (0.47 in). They are similar to Sophrops pumilus, but have only nine-segmented antennae, and the forceps is also somewhat differently shaped. The head is densely punctate, the clypeus is arcuately emarginate, and its anterior angles are rounded. The antennal fan is slightly longer in males than the five preceding segments of the stalk combined, while in females it is shorter and oval. The pronotum is similar in shape to that of pumila, but its surface is somewhat more strongly wrinkled than in that species. The scutellum is irregularly punctate. The elytra are weakly wrinkled and covered with umbilical punctures and three indistinct ribs are visible on each elytron. The pygidium has fairly dense punctation, and its anterior margin is dull. The underside is lighter than the upper side. The glossy center is widely punctured, the punctures are closer together on the pruinose sides.
