= Sophrops teinzoanus =

Scientific classification
- Kingdom: Animalia
- Phylum: Arthropoda
- Clade: Pancrustacea
- Class: Insecta
- Order: Coleoptera
- Suborder: Polyphaga
- Infraorder: Scarabaeiformia
- Family: Scarabaeidae
- Genus: Sophrops
- Species: S. teinzoanus

Binomial name
- Sophrops teinzoanus (Moser, 1918)

Synonyms
- Microtrichia teinzoana Moser, 1918

Species of beetle

Sophrops teinzoanus is a species of beetle of the family Scarabaeidae. It is found in Myanmar.

== Description ==
Adults reach a length of about 15 mm. They are brown, with the head and pronotum blackish-brown and the abdomen reddish-yellow. The head is densely punctate and the antennae are reddish-yellow. The pronotum is very densely punctate. The elytra are also punctate and each elytron has four ribs.
