= Sophrops formosanus =

Scientific classification
- Kingdom: Animalia
- Phylum: Arthropoda
- Clade: Pancrustacea
- Class: Insecta
- Order: Coleoptera
- Suborder: Polyphaga
- Infraorder: Scarabaeiformia
- Family: Scarabaeidae
- Genus: Sophrops
- Species: S. formosanus

Binomial name
- Sophrops formosanus (Moser, 1913)

Synonyms
- Microtrichia formosana Moser, 1913

Species of beetle

Sophrops formosanus is a species of beetle of the family Scarabaeidae. It is found in Taiwan.

== Description ==
Adults reach a length of about 14–16 mm (0.55–0.63 in). They are similar to Sophrops assamensis in colouration and shape. The head is densely and rather strongly punctate, the anterior margin of the clypeus is not quite as deeply emarginate as in assamensis. The antennae are brown, with a yellow club. The pronotum is of a similar shape to that of assamensis, equally densely punctate, but the spaces between the punctures are only very weakly longitudinally wrinkled, whereas in assamensis they are very distinct. A distinct marginal ridge is also found on each side of the posterior margin. The scutellum is punctate except for the smooth lateral margins. The elytra are transversely wrinkled and umbilicately punctate, the smoother ribs are weakly prominent. The convex pygidium is quite densely covered with umbilical punctures, its anterior margin is dull. On the underside, the shiny center is widely punctate, while on the dull, pruinose sides the punctures are somewhat closer together. Some of the lateral punctures bear small setae, and scattered fine yellowish hairs are visible on the penultimate abdominal segment.
