= Holotrichia wiebesi =

Scientific classification
- Kingdom: Animalia
- Phylum: Arthropoda
- Clade: Pancrustacea
- Class: Insecta
- Order: Coleoptera
- Suborder: Polyphaga
- Infraorder: Scarabaeiformia
- Family: Scarabaeidae
- Tribe: Melolonthini
- Genus: Holotrichia
- Species: H. wiebesi

Binomial name
- Holotrichia wiebesi Frey, 1970

Species of beetle

Holotrichia wiebesi is a species of beetle of the family Scarabaeidae. It is found in Vietnam.

== Description ==
Adults reach a length of about 17–18 mm (0.67–0.71 in). The head and pronotum are blackish-brown, while the elytra, pygidium and underside are brown. The elytra and the center of the underside are shiny, the lateral margins of the thorax and ventral segments tomentose and the last segment also entirely pruinose.

== Etymology ==
The species is dedicated to Dr. Wiebes, custos of the Leiden Museum.
