= Sophrops kanarana =

Scientific classification
- Kingdom: Animalia
- Phylum: Arthropoda
- Clade: Pancrustacea
- Class: Insecta
- Order: Coleoptera
- Suborder: Polyphaga
- Infraorder: Scarabaeiformia
- Family: Scarabaeidae
- Genus: Sophrops
- Species: S. kanarana

Binomial name
- Sophrops kanarana (Moser, 1918)

Synonyms
- Microtrichia kanarana Moser, 1918

Species of beetle

Sophrops kanarana is a species of beetle of the family Scarabaeidae. It is found in India (Karnataka).

== Description ==
Adults reach a length of about 8–9 mm. They are blackish-brown and shiny. The head is strongly punctured and the antennae are brown. The pronotum is not particularly densely covered with strong punctures. Before the posterior margin of the elytra, the punctures are briefly bristled with pale hairs. The underside is dull and pruinose except for the shiny center.
