= Sophrops pruinosipennis =

Scientific classification
- Kingdom: Animalia
- Phylum: Arthropoda
- Clade: Pancrustacea
- Class: Insecta
- Order: Coleoptera
- Suborder: Polyphaga
- Infraorder: Scarabaeiformia
- Family: Scarabaeidae
- Genus: Sophrops
- Species: S. pruinosipennis

Binomial name
- Sophrops pruinosipennis (Moser, 1915)

Synonyms
- Microtrichia pruinosipennis Moser, 1915

Species of beetle

Sophrops pruinosipennis is a species of beetle of the family Scarabaeidae. It is found in Laos.

== Description ==
Adults reach a length of about 17 mm (0.67 in). They are similar to Sophrops nilgirinus, but may be distinguished by a different claw formation, as well as by the short but distinct setae on the elytra. The upper surface is brown and the head, pronotum and scutellum are dark, while the elytra are pruinose. The head is densely and coarsely punctate. The clypeus does not taper anteriorly and the anterior angles are broadly rounded, while the anterior margin is emarginate in the middle. The antennae are brown. The pronotum is twice as wide as it is long at the base and arched in the middle. The lateral margins are finely serrated before the middle and the anterior and posterior angles are obtuse, the former only weakly so. The surface is densely punctate. A narrow, smooth median line disappears behind the anterior margin. The scutellum is punctate except in the middle. On the elytra, the umbilical punctures are moderately close together. Each elytron has four narrow, smooth ridges. The pygidium is dull at the anterior margin, bears fairly dense punctation, and projects somewhat conically before the posterior margin. The underside is reddish-brown, the abdomen more or less reddish-yellow.
