= Sophrops impressicollis =

Scientific classification
- Kingdom: Animalia
- Phylum: Arthropoda
- Clade: Pancrustacea
- Class: Insecta
- Order: Coleoptera
- Suborder: Polyphaga
- Infraorder: Scarabaeiformia
- Family: Scarabaeidae
- Genus: Sophrops
- Species: S. impressicollis

Binomial name
- Sophrops impressicollis (Moser, 1913)

Synonyms
- Microtrichia impressicollis Moser, 1913

Species of beetle

Sophrops impressicollis is a species of beetle of the family Scarabaeidae. It is found in Indonesia (Sumatra, Java).

== Description ==
Adults reach a length of about 15 mm (0.59 in). They are similar to Sophrops cribripennis, but easily distinguished by the fact that the pronotum is flatly depressed in front of the scutellum. The colouration is brown, with the head and pronotum blackish-brown. The head is densely and coarsely punctate, the anterior margin of the clypeus is shallowly triangularly emarginate, and the anterior angles are rounded. The antennae are brown. The pronotum is strongly and rather densely punctate, with a midline that is shortened on both sides and smooth. A distinct marginal ridge is present on each side of the posterior margin. The scutellum is punctate except for an indistinct midline. The elytra are weakly wrinkled, rather densely umbilicately punctate, the punctures bearing minute setae. Ribs are barely noticeable. The pygidium has prominent umbilical punctures and its posterior margin is fringed with yellow cilia. The sparsely punctured underside is brown, the abdomen yellow.
