= Sophrops planipennis =

Scientific classification
- Kingdom: Animalia
- Phylum: Arthropoda
- Clade: Pancrustacea
- Class: Insecta
- Order: Coleoptera
- Suborder: Polyphaga
- Infraorder: Scarabaeiformia
- Family: Scarabaeidae
- Genus: Sophrops
- Species: S. planipennis

Binomial name
- Sophrops planipennis (Moser, 1913)

Synonyms
- Microtrichia planipennis Moser, 1913

Species of beetle

Sophrops planipennis is a species of beetle of the family Scarabaeidae. It is found in Indonesia (Kalimantan).

== Description ==
Adults reach a length of about 16–20 mm (0.63–0.79 in). They are similar to Sophrops cephalotes, but the punctures on the upper surface are grey tomentose and have tiny yellow setae. The head is as broad as in cephalotes, coarsely punctured, and the anterior margin of the clypeus is deeply triangularly emarginate in the middle. The pronotum is considerably wider than long, somewhat arched in the middle, with obtuse posterior angles and almost right-angled, not projecting anterior angles. It is densely covered with elongate punctures, which are filled with grey tomentose and have short yellow setae along the anterior margin. The scutellum is covered with round umbilical punctures. The elytra lack ribs and they are wrinkled, the spots are umbilical, short-bristled, and surrounded by a grey tomentose circle, which is wider at the rear than at the front. The pygidium is not particularly densely covered with bristled umbilical spots. Its anterior margin and lateral edges are dull. The center of the underside and the legs are glossy, while the sides of the thorax and abdomen are dull and pruinose. The punctation of the underside is moderately dense. The spots bear tiny setae, and on the penultimate abdominal segment, some fine hairs.
