= Holotrichia vietnamensis =

Scientific classification
- Kingdom: Animalia
- Phylum: Arthropoda
- Clade: Pancrustacea
- Class: Insecta
- Order: Coleoptera
- Suborder: Polyphaga
- Infraorder: Scarabaeiformia
- Family: Scarabaeidae
- Tribe: Melolonthini
- Genus: Holotrichia
- Species: H. vietnamensis

Binomial name
- Holotrichia vietnamensis Frey, 1970

Species of beetle

Holotrichia vietnamensis is a species of beetle of the family Scarabaeidae. It is found in Vietnam.

== Description ==
Adults reach a length of about 18–23 mm (0.71–0.91 in). The head and pronotum are dark brown, while the elytra, underside, antennae and pygidium are light brown and faintly shiny to dull. The dorsal surface of the head and pronotum are very densely rugosely punctate and there are denser yellow hairs on the sides and longer, erect hairs scattered on the disc.
