= Holotrichia costulata =

Scientific classification
- Kingdom: Animalia
- Phylum: Arthropoda
- Clade: Pancrustacea
- Class: Insecta
- Order: Coleoptera
- Suborder: Polyphaga
- Infraorder: Scarabaeiformia
- Family: Scarabaeidae
- Tribe: Melolonthini
- Genus: Holotrichia
- Species: H. costulata

Binomial name
- Holotrichia costulata Frey, 1970

Species of beetle

Holotrichia costulata is a species of beetle of the family Scarabaeidae. It is found in Cambodia and Thailand.

== Description ==
Adults reach a length of about 24–29 mm (0.94–1.14 in). The upper surface is blackish-brown, dull and tomentose, while the underside is brown. The upper surface is glabrous except for the cilia on the margin of the pronotum and at the base of the pygidium. The underside of the thorax is covered with long, shaggy hairs.
