= Pedinotrichia =

Scientific classification
- Kingdom: Animalia
- Phylum: Arthropoda
- Clade: Pancrustacea
- Class: Insecta
- Order: Coleoptera
- Suborder: Polyphaga
- Infraorder: Scarabaeiformia
- Family: Scarabaeidae
- Subfamily: Melolonthinae
- Tribe: Rhizotrogini
- Genus: Pedinotrichia; Matsumoto, 2016

Genus of leaf beetles

Pedinotrichia is a genus of beetles belonging to the family Scarabaeidae.

== Species ==
- Pedinotrichia kwatungensis (Zhang, 1965)
- Pedinotrichia laevigata (Zhang, 1965)
- Pedinotrichia magna (Itoh, 1995)
- Pedinotrichia mausonia (Moser, 1908)
- Pedinotrichia omeia (Zhang, 1965)
- Pedinotrichia parallela (Motschulsky, 1854)
- Pedinotrichia picea (Waterhouse, 1875)
- Pedinotrichia pilifrons (Moser, 1921)
- Pedinotrichia rufodorsalis (Matsumoto, 2009)
- Pedinotrichia setiventris (Moser, 1912)
- Pedinotrichia shibatai (Nomura, 1977)
- Pedinotrichia ungulata (Zhang, 1965)
- Pedinotrichia yunnana (Moser, 1912)
