= Holotrichia danielssoni =

Scientific classification
- Kingdom: Animalia
- Phylum: Arthropoda
- Clade: Pancrustacea
- Class: Insecta
- Order: Coleoptera
- Suborder: Polyphaga
- Infraorder: Scarabaeiformia
- Family: Scarabaeidae
- Tribe: Melolonthini
- Genus: Holotrichia
- Species: H. danielssoni

Binomial name
- Holotrichia danielssoni Bunalski, 1995

Species of beetle

Holotrichia danielssoni is a species of dung beetle found in Sri Lanka.
