= Sophrops acutangularis =

Scientific classification
- Kingdom: Animalia
- Phylum: Arthropoda
- Clade: Pancrustacea
- Class: Insecta
- Order: Coleoptera
- Suborder: Polyphaga
- Infraorder: Scarabaeiformia
- Family: Scarabaeidae
- Genus: Sophrops
- Species: S. acutangularis

Binomial name
- Sophrops acutangularis (Moser, 1918)

Synonyms
- Microtrichia acutangularis Moser, 1918

Species of beetle

Sophrops acutangularis is a species of beetle of the family Scarabaeidae. It is found in China (Jiangxi).

== Description ==
Adults reach a length of about 16 mm. They are blackish-brown and shiny above, but dull below. The thorax is reddish-brown, while the abdomen is grey and pruinose. The head is densely punctate and the antennae are yellowish-brown. The elytra is punctured and each elytron has four smooth ribs. The underside has close punctation and there are yellowish hairs along the sides of the thorax.
