= Sophrops deliensis =

Scientific classification
- Kingdom: Animalia
- Phylum: Arthropoda
- Clade: Pancrustacea
- Class: Insecta
- Order: Coleoptera
- Suborder: Polyphaga
- Infraorder: Scarabaeiformia
- Family: Scarabaeidae
- Genus: Sophrops
- Species: S. deliensis

Binomial name
- Sophrops deliensis (Moser, 1917)

Synonyms
- Microtrichia deliensis Moser, 1917

Species of beetle

Sophrops deliensis is a species of beetle of the family Scarabaeidae. It is found in Indonesia (Sumatra).

== Description ==
Adults reach a length of about 14 mm (0.55 in). They are similar to Sophrops cribripennis. They are black above and reddish-brown below, while the abdomen is yellowish-brown. The sides are brown, and the underside is pruinose. The head is quite densely punctate, the clypeus is slightly tapered anteriorly, but much less so than in cribripennis. The anterior margin, unlike that of the latter species, is only very weakly indented. The pronotum is of similar shape and sculpture in both species, the lateral margins being slightly notched. The scutellum is punctate except in the middle. The elytra are wrinkled, the ribs are faintly indicated, and the umbilical punctures bear extremely minute setae. The pygidium is quite densely covered with coarse punctures.
