= Rufotrichia =

Scientific classification
- Kingdom: Animalia
- Phylum: Arthropoda
- Clade: Pancrustacea
- Class: Insecta
- Order: Coleoptera
- Suborder: Polyphaga
- Infraorder: Scarabaeiformia
- Family: Scarabaeidae
- Subfamily: Melolonthinae
- Tribe: Rhizotrogini
- Genus: Rufotrichia; Matsumoto, 2016

Genus of leaf beetles

Rufotrichia is a genus of beetles belonging to the family Scarabaeidae.

== Species ==
- Rufotrichia aritai (Nomura, 1964)
- Rufotrichia herwangshana (Kobayashi, 1990)
- Rufotrichia mizusawai (Kobayashi, 1986)
- Rufotrichia montana (Moser, 1912)
- Rufotrichia pubifemorata (Kobayashi, 1995)
- Rufotrichia rufescens (Moser, 1912)
- Rufotrichia rufina (Moser, 1912)
- Rufotrichia rufula (Moser, 1912)
- Rufotrichia simillima (Moser, 1912)
- Rufotrichia sororia (Moser, 1912)
- Rufotrichia yui (Kobayashi, 1995)
