= Holotrichia nathani =

Scientific classification
- Kingdom: Animalia
- Phylum: Arthropoda
- Clade: Pancrustacea
- Class: Insecta
- Order: Coleoptera
- Suborder: Polyphaga
- Infraorder: Scarabaeiformia
- Family: Scarabaeidae
- Tribe: Melolonthini
- Genus: Holotrichia
- Species: H. nathani

Binomial name
- Holotrichia nathani Frey, 1971

Species of beetle

Holotrichia nathani is a species of beetle of the family Scarabaeidae. It is found in southern India.

== Description ==
Adults reach a length of about 18–19 mm.
