= Holotrichia umbrata =

Scientific classification
- Kingdom: Animalia
- Phylum: Arthropoda
- Clade: Pancrustacea
- Class: Insecta
- Order: Coleoptera
- Suborder: Polyphaga
- Infraorder: Scarabaeiformia
- Family: Scarabaeidae
- Tribe: Melolonthini
- Genus: Holotrichia
- Species: H. umbrata

Binomial name
- Holotrichia umbrata Frey, 1970

Species of beetle

Holotrichia umbrata is a species of beetle of the family Scarabaeidae. It is found in Malaysia.

== Description ==
Adults reach a length of about 22 mm (0.87 in). The head, pronotum and the first half of the elytra are dark brown, while the second half of the elytra is light brown. The underside is brown and the antennae are light brown. The upper surface is glabrous except for the cilia on the posterior margin and on the underside of the pygidium.
