= Holotrichia helleri =

Scientific classification
- Kingdom: Animalia
- Phylum: Arthropoda
- Clade: Pancrustacea
- Class: Insecta
- Order: Coleoptera
- Suborder: Polyphaga
- Infraorder: Scarabaeiformia
- Family: Scarabaeidae
- Tribe: Melolonthini
- Genus: Holotrichia
- Species: H. helleri

Binomial name
- Holotrichia helleri Brenske, 1894

Synonyms
- Holotrichia rugiceps Moser, 1909

Species of beetle

Holotrichia helleri is a species of beetle of the family Scarabaeidae. It is found in Indonesia (Java).
