= Rufotrichia simillima =

Scientific classification
- Kingdom: Animalia
- Phylum: Arthropoda
- Clade: Pancrustacea
- Class: Insecta
- Order: Coleoptera
- Suborder: Polyphaga
- Infraorder: Scarabaeiformia
- Family: Scarabaeidae
- Genus: Rufotrichia
- Species: R. simillima

Binomial name
- Rufotrichia simillima (Moser, 1912)

Synonyms
- Holotrichia simillima Moser, 1912

Species of beetle

Rufotrichia simillima is a species of beetle of the family Scarabaeidae. It is found in China (Fujian).

== Description ==
Adults reach a length of about 18 mm (0.71 in). They are similar to Rufotrichia rufescens in shape and colouration. The head is coarsely and the clypeus is very densely punctate. The latter has a slightly upturned margin, which is weakly emarginate in the middle. The antennae are brown, with the club lighter. The surface is quite densely punctate and weakly wrinkled, particularly on the sides. The posterior margin is laterally crenate. The scutellum shows a smooth midline. The elytra are umbilicately punctate and weakly wrinkled. The pygidium is somewhat wider than in rufescens, and the punctation is slightly closer together.
