= Holotrichia rufoflava =

Scientific classification
- Kingdom: Animalia
- Phylum: Arthropoda
- Class: Insecta
- Order: Coleoptera
- Suborder: Polyphaga
- Infraorder: Scarabaeiformia
- Family: Scarabaeidae
- Genus: Holotrichia
- Species: H. rufoflava

Binomial name
- Holotrichia rufoflava Brenske 1894

Species of beetle

Holotrichia rufoflava is a species of dung beetle found in South India and Sri Lanka.

== Biology ==
It is a shiny light colored beetle with an enlarged body measuring 18-22mm in length. Clypeus and head punctuations are close and deep. Adult beetles are phytophagous and frequently observed in rose and Albizia species. The damage becomes severe during April rains. Adults and grubs are known as minor pests on Vanilla planifolia, Arachis hypogaea, and Azadirachta indica.
