= Sophrops promeanus =

Scientific classification
- Kingdom: Animalia
- Phylum: Arthropoda
- Clade: Pancrustacea
- Class: Insecta
- Order: Coleoptera
- Suborder: Polyphaga
- Infraorder: Scarabaeiformia
- Family: Scarabaeidae
- Genus: Sophrops
- Species: S. promeanus

Binomial name
- Sophrops promeanus (Moser, 1918)

Synonyms
- Microtrichia promeana Moser, 1918

Species of beetle

Sophrops promeanus is a species of beetle of the family Scarabaeidae. It is found in Myanmar, Thailand and Vietnam.

== Description ==
Adults reach a length of about 12–14 mm. They are brown or blackish-brown and shiny above, while they are reddish-brown below. The head is densely punctate and the antennae are dark brown, with a light brown club. The surface of the pronotum is moderately densely covered with strong punctures and there is a smooth median spot.
