= Rufotrichia rufina =

Scientific classification
- Kingdom: Animalia
- Phylum: Arthropoda
- Clade: Pancrustacea
- Class: Insecta
- Order: Coleoptera
- Suborder: Polyphaga
- Infraorder: Scarabaeiformia
- Family: Scarabaeidae
- Genus: Rufotrichia
- Species: R. rufina

Binomial name
- Rufotrichia rufina (Moser, 1912)

Synonyms
- Holotrichia rufina Moser, 1912

Species of beetle

Rufotrichia rufina is a species of beetle of the family Scarabaeidae. It is found in China (Guangdong).

== Description ==
Adults reach a length of about 25 mm (0.98 in). They are reddish-brown and very similar to Rufotrichia rufula. The head is coarse, the clypeus wrinkled and punctate, its margin slightly upturned as in rufula, the anterior margin emarginate in the middle. The antennae are brown, with a lighter club. The pronotum is quite densely covered with umbilical punctures. An indistinct midline and a small spot on each side of the middle before the anterior margin are smooth. The scutellum bears several punctures on either side of the middle. The elytra are punctate and weakly wrinkled, with the ribs almost smooth. The pygidium is wider than long and somewhat more widely punctate than in rufula. The chest is covered in yellow hairs, the abdomen in the middle with very fine and widely spaced, needle-like, tiny bristly punctures, which are somewhat denser towards the sides.
