= Holotrichia seticollis =

Scientific classification
- Kingdom: Animalia
- Phylum: Arthropoda
- Clade: Pancrustacea
- Class: Insecta
- Order: Coleoptera
- Suborder: Polyphaga
- Infraorder: Scarabaeiformia
- Family: Scarabaeidae
- Tribe: Melolonthini
- Genus: Holotrichia
- Species: H. seticollis

Binomial name
- Holotrichia seticollis Moser, 1912

Species of beetle

Holotrichia seticollis is a species of beetle of the family Scarabaeidae. It is found in India (Sikkim) and Nepal.

== Description ==
Adults reach a length of about 22 mm (0.87 in). They are blackish-brown, with the head, the middle of the thorax and abdomen, and the legs glossy. The head is robust, with almost wrinkled punctures on the frons. The pronotum is considerably wider than long, widest slightly behind the middle, and tapering anteriorly and posteriorly. The lateral margins are crenate and, like the raised anterior margin, fringed with yellow cilia. The punctation of the pronotum is sparse and only quite dense on the sides before the anterior angles. Scattered across the entire surface are isolated coarse punctures, each bearing a protruding hair. The scutellum bears fine punctures, the center being almost unpunctate. On the elytra, the primary ribs are only very sparsely punctured, while the interstitia show moderately dense punctation. The pygidium is covered with sparsely spaced umbilical punctures. The thorax is covered with long yellow hairs and the abdomen is finely and very sparsely punctured, shiny in the middle and dull on the sides.
