= Sophrops rugatus =

Scientific classification
- Kingdom: Animalia
- Phylum: Arthropoda
- Clade: Pancrustacea
- Class: Insecta
- Order: Coleoptera
- Suborder: Polyphaga
- Infraorder: Scarabaeiformia
- Family: Scarabaeidae
- Genus: Sophrops
- Species: S. rugatus

Binomial name
- Sophrops rugatus (Moser, 1915)

Synonyms
- Microtrichia rugata Moser, 1915

Species of beetle

Sophrops rugatus is a species of beetle of the family Scarabaeidae. It is found in China (Yunnan).

== Description ==
Adults reach a length of about 11 mm (0.43 in). They are similar to Sophrops pumilus, but have a finer and much more extensive punctation of the underside. The head is coarsely and densely punctate, the clypeus is more strongly narrowed anteriorly, the anterior margin is rather deeply emarginate and the anterior angles are rounded. The antenna are reddish with a dark club. The pronotum is twice as wide as it is long, widest slightly behind the middle, the lateral margins are slightly notched, the anterior and posterior angles are obtuse, the surface is somewhat wrinkled, coarsely and irregularly punctate. The elytra, covered with umbilical punctures, are rather coarsely wrinkled, so that the 3–4 ribs on each elytron are only indistinctly marked. The pygidium also bears wrinkled punctation. On the underside, the shiny center is only finely and widely punctate, while on the pruinose sides the punctures are somewhat closer together.
