= Sophrops sericeicollis =

Scientific classification
- Kingdom: Animalia
- Phylum: Arthropoda
- Clade: Pancrustacea
- Class: Insecta
- Order: Coleoptera
- Suborder: Polyphaga
- Infraorder: Scarabaeiformia
- Family: Scarabaeidae
- Genus: Sophrops
- Species: S. sericeicollis

Binomial name
- Sophrops sericeicollis (Moser, 1915)

Synonyms
- Microtrichia sericeicollis Moser, 1915

Species of beetle

Sophrops sericeicollis is a species of beetle of the family Scarabaeidae. It is found in Myanmar and Vietnam.

== Description ==
Adults reach a length of about 15 mm (0.59 in). They are similar to Sophrops chinensis, but the pronotum is more finely and much more densely punctate than in S. chinensis and has a silky sheen due to the dense punctation. The antennal fan in S. chinensis is somewhat elongated, almost as long as the six preceding stalk segments combined, whereas in S. sericeicollis it is hardly as long as the five preceding stalk segments combined.
