= Sophrops egregius =

Scientific classification
- Kingdom: Animalia
- Phylum: Arthropoda
- Clade: Pancrustacea
- Class: Insecta
- Order: Coleoptera
- Suborder: Polyphaga
- Infraorder: Scarabaeiformia
- Family: Scarabaeidae
- Genus: Sophrops
- Species: S. egregius

Binomial name
- Sophrops egregius (Moser, 1912)

Synonyms
- Holotrichia egregia Moser, 1912

Species of beetle

Sophrops egregius is a species of beetle of the family Scarabaeidae. It is found in India (Assam).

== Description ==
Adults reach a length of about 16–17 mm (0.63–0.67 in). They are similar to Sophrops planicollis, but are smaller and the shape of the clypeus differs. The head is densely and strongly punctate, the clypeus is much broader than in S. planicollis, and its lateral margins are not angled inwards in front of the eyes. The pronotum is very densely punctate, and the punctation is slightly coarser than in S. planicollis. The sculpture of the scutellum and elytra is similar to that of the latter species. The pygidium is shiny before the apex and somewhat more densely punctate there, whereas in S. planicollis, the punctation on the pygidium is uniform throughout. The underside is dull and sparsely punctate and the middle of the thorax is shiny and densely punctate, as in S. planicollis. The legs are dark brown and shiny.
