= Rufotrichia montana =

Scientific classification
- Kingdom: Animalia
- Phylum: Arthropoda
- Clade: Pancrustacea
- Class: Insecta
- Order: Coleoptera
- Suborder: Polyphaga
- Infraorder: Scarabaeiformia
- Family: Scarabaeidae
- Genus: Rufotrichia
- Species: R. montana

Binomial name
- Rufotrichia montana (Moser, 1912)

Synonyms
- Holotrichia montana Moser, 1912

Species of beetle

Rufotrichia montana is a species of beetle of the family Scarabaeidae. It is found in Vietnam.

== Description ==
Adults reach a length of about 25 mm (0.98 in). They are black and shiny, the elytra with a purple shimmer. The pygidium and abdomen are brown. They are very similar to Sophrops iridescens, but have a different colour, the pronotum is less laterally expanded and the surface punctation is somewhat weaker, as is the crenulation at the posterior margin. The punctation of the elytra is likewise somewhat weaker, and the spaces between the punctures are hardly wrinkled. The pygidium is about half as wide as it is long, and the punctation is more widely spaced and somewhat finer. On the underside, the center of the thorax of is also pubescent, whereas in iridescens the center is almost bare. On the abdomen, the punctures, particularly on the sides, are much more widely spaced, and the punctation of the legs is also finer.
