= Pedinotrichia setiventris =

Scientific classification
- Kingdom: Animalia
- Phylum: Arthropoda
- Clade: Pancrustacea
- Class: Insecta
- Order: Coleoptera
- Suborder: Polyphaga
- Infraorder: Scarabaeiformia
- Family: Scarabaeidae
- Genus: Pedinotrichia
- Species: P. setiventris

Binomial name
- Pedinotrichia setiventris (Moser, 1912)

Synonyms
- Holotrichia setiventris Moser, 1912

Species of beetle

Pedinotrichia setiventris is a species of beetle of the family Scarabaeidae. It is found in Vietnam.

== Description ==
Adults reach a length of about 22 mm (0.87 in). They are black and glossy, the elytra with a faint brownish sheen. The legs are brown and the antennae are reddish-brown. The pronotum is almost three times as wide as it is long in the middle, its lateral margins are not crenate, the anterior angles are rather strongly projecting. The surface is rather densely and moderately strongly punctate, the interstices between the punctures are weakly wrinkled next to the lateral margins. The scutellum is punctate in the same way as the pronotum, with an indistinct smooth midline. The elytra are rather strongly punctate, the intervals between the punctures are slightly wrinkled, the ribs appear faintly as smoother bands. The pygidium is covered with umbilical punctures bearing short, erect yellow setae, the intervals being weakly leathery and wrinkled. It is strongly compressed laterally, so that a blunt longitudinal keel forms in the middle of the posterior half. The chest is covered with yellowish hairs and the abdomen, with the exception of the last segment, is dull, and punctured, each puncture marked with a short yellow seta.
