= Sophrops luangia =

Scientific classification
- Kingdom: Animalia
- Phylum: Arthropoda
- Clade: Pancrustacea
- Class: Insecta
- Order: Coleoptera
- Suborder: Polyphaga
- Infraorder: Scarabaeiformia
- Family: Scarabaeidae
- Genus: Sophrops
- Species: S. luangia

Binomial name
- Sophrops luangia (Moser, 1912)

Synonyms
- Holotrichia luangia Moser, 1912

Species of beetle

Sophrops luangia is a species of beetle of the family Scarabaeidae. It is found in Vietnam.

== Description ==
Adults reach a length of about 18 mm (0.71 in). They are similar to Sophrops cephalotes, but they have a much narrower head and the sculpture of the head and pronotum is different. The head is coarsely, weakly wrinkled-punctate and the clypeus is rather deeply emarginate in the middle. The antennae are brown. The pronotum is similar in shape to that of Sophrops planicollis, but somewhat less broad and coarsely punctate, the spaces between the punctures being longitudinally wrinkled. The scutellum is punctate except for the sides and a midline. The elytral punctation is strong, the spaces between the punctures are weakly wrinkled. The pygidium is mostly glossy and coarsely punctate, more finely punctate in the dull areas. The underside is brown, in the middle shiny, but dull on the sides. The center of the chest is not as densely punctured as in S planicollis, but more densely than in S. cephalotes.
