= Nigrotrichia siamensis =

Scientific classification
- Kingdom: Animalia
- Phylum: Arthropoda
- Clade: Pancrustacea
- Class: Insecta
- Order: Coleoptera
- Suborder: Polyphaga
- Infraorder: Scarabaeiformia
- Family: Scarabaeidae
- Genus: Nigrotrichia
- Species: N. siamensis

Binomial name
- Nigrotrichia siamensis (Frey, 1970)

Synonyms
- Holotrichia siamensis Frey, 1970

Species of beetle

Nigrotrichia siamensis is a species of beetle of the family Scarabaeidae. It is found in Thailand.

== Description ==
Adults reach a length of about 19–23 mm (0.75–0.91 in). The pronotum and head are dark brown and faintly glossy, while the pygidium and underside are light brown. The antennae are brown.
