= Pedinotrichia yunnana =

Scientific classification
- Kingdom: Animalia
- Phylum: Arthropoda
- Clade: Pancrustacea
- Class: Insecta
- Order: Coleoptera
- Suborder: Polyphaga
- Infraorder: Scarabaeiformia
- Family: Scarabaeidae
- Genus: Pedinotrichia
- Species: P. yunnana

Binomial name
- Pedinotrichia yunnana (Moser, 1912)

Synonyms
- Holotrichia yunnana Moser, 1912; Holotrichia pilipyga Zhang, 1965

Species of beetle

Pedinotrichia yunnana is a species of beetle of the family Scarabaeidae. It is found in China (Yunnan) and Cambodia.

== Description ==
Adults reach a length of about 20 mm (0.79 in). They are yellowish-brown, with the upper surface is silky-glossy. The frons is sparsely punctate, its center slightly depressed at the clypeus suture. The punctation of the clypeus is somewhat coarser and particularly dense at the base. The pronotum is very short and broad, moderately densely punctate with an indistinct, smooth midline. The sides are arched in the middle, the posterior angles only slightly obtuse, and the anterior angles somewhat projecting. The posterior margin of the pronotum is arched posteriorly in front of the scutellum. The scutellum is finely punctate with a smooth midline. The elytral punctation is not very dense but rather coarse and the ribs are almost smooth. The pygidium is dull and covered with fine, needle-like punctures, which are short and yellow-bristled. The thorax is covered with long yellow hairs and the abdomen is shiny and sparsely punctured in the middle, dull and more densely punctured on the sides. All punctures are covered with yellow setae.
