= Nigrotrichia convexopyga =

Scientific classification
- Kingdom: Animalia
- Phylum: Arthropoda
- Clade: Pancrustacea
- Class: Insecta
- Order: Coleoptera
- Suborder: Polyphaga
- Infraorder: Scarabaeiformia
- Family: Scarabaeidae
- Genus: Nigrotrichia
- Species: N. convexopyga

Binomial name
- Nigrotrichia convexopyga (Moser, 1912)

Synonyms
- Holotrichia convexopyga Moser, 1912; Lachnosterna convexopyga tametomo Nomura, 1969

Species of beetle

Nigrotrichia convexopyga is a species of beetle of the family Scarabaeidae. It is found in China (Gansu, Guizhou, Hebei, Jiangxi, Shaanxi) and Japan.

== Description ==
Adults reach a length of about 21 mm (0.83 in). They are very similar to Nigrotrichia kiotonensis, but differs slightly in the structure of the pygidium. The colouration is blackish-brown or light brown. The frons is not densely punctured, while the clypeus somewhat more densely punctured. The elytra are of the same shape as in Nigrotrichia kiotonensis, but the punctures are not quite as strong and are somewhat more widely spaced. The scutellum is smooth or bears numerous punctures. The pygidium is widely punctured, with the punctures large but flat. The anterior half of the pygidium is strongly convex in both sexes, with the convexity flattening towards the posterior margin. The thorax is covered with yellow hairs and the middle of the abdomen is almost smooth.
