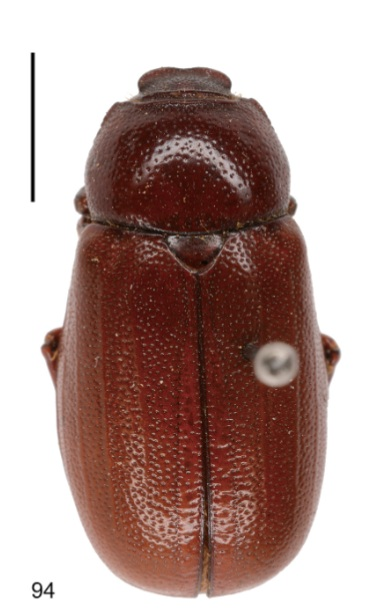

Scientific classification
- Kingdom: Animalia
- Phylum: Arthropoda
- Clade: Pancrustacea
- Class: Insecta
- Order: Coleoptera
- Suborder: Polyphaga
- Infraorder: Scarabaeiformia
- Family: Scarabaeidae
- Genus: Miridiba
- Species: M. scutata

Binomial name
- Miridiba scutata (Reitter, 1902)

Synonyms
- Holotrichia scutata Reitter, 1902; Miridiba lassallei Keith, 2010; Holotrichia scutulata Dalla Torre, 1912

= Miridiba scutata =

Species of beetle

Miridiba scutata is a species of beetle of the family Scarabaeidae. It is found in China (Guangxi, Hong Kong) and Vietnam.

== Description ==
Adults reach a length of about 14–16 mm. The dorsal surface is glabrous. The pronotal surface is shiny, regularly punctate (with the punctures closer together just behind the anterior margin) and glabrous, at most with tiny setae on each puncture. The lateral margins of the pronotum are serrated and pubescent. The scutellum is without punctures and glabrous. The elytral surface is glabrous, at most with tiny setae on each puncture. The striations are weakly defined and the punctures are distributed between the striae.
