= Sophrops rugulosus =

Scientific classification
- Kingdom: Animalia
- Phylum: Arthropoda
- Clade: Pancrustacea
- Class: Insecta
- Order: Coleoptera
- Suborder: Polyphaga
- Infraorder: Scarabaeiformia
- Family: Scarabaeidae
- Genus: Sophrops
- Species: S. rugulosus

Binomial name
- Sophrops rugulosus (Brenske, 1892)

Synonyms
- Brahmina rugulosa Brenske, 1892; Phyllophaga rugans Saylor, 1937; Microtrichia confusa Moser, 1917

Species of beetle

Sophrops rugulosus is a species of beetle of the family Scarabaeidae. It is found in Indonesia (Sumatra, Kalimantan) and Malaysia (Sarawak).

== Description ==
Adults reach a length of about 12–16 mm (0.47–0.63 in).

== Subspecies ==
- Sophrops rugulosus rugulosus (Indonesia: Kalimantan; Malaysia: Sarawak)
- Sophrops rugulosus confusus (Moser, 1917) (Indonesia: Sumatra)
- Sophrops rugulosus harauensis Itoh, 1993 (Indonesia: Sumatra)
