= Nigrotrichia opacipennis =

Scientific classification
- Kingdom: Animalia
- Phylum: Arthropoda
- Clade: Pancrustacea
- Class: Insecta
- Order: Coleoptera
- Suborder: Polyphaga
- Infraorder: Scarabaeiformia
- Family: Scarabaeidae
- Genus: Nigrotrichia
- Species: N. opacipennis

Binomial name
- Nigrotrichia opacipennis (Moser, 1912)

Synonyms
- Holotrichia opacipennis Moser, 1912

Species of beetle

Nigrotrichia opacipennis is a species of beetle of the family Scarabaeidae. It is found in Laos and Vietnam.

== Description ==
Adults reach a length of about 20–22 mm (0.79–0.87 in). The head and pronotum are blackish, while the elytra are brown and pruinous. The head is densely punctate and the antennae are brown. The lateral margins of the pronotum are only very weakly crenate and the punctation is quite strong and denser laterally. The scutellum bears several punctures on each side of the middle. The elytra have moderately dense umbilical punctures and the ribs are weakly prominent. The pygidium is yellowish-brown, faintly glossy, and not very densely covered with umbilical punctures. The underside is brown and the abdomen yellowish-brown. The thorax is sparsely pubescent laterally, the abdomen almost smooth and glossy in the middle, but somewhat duller laterally.
