= Rufotrichia rufescens =

Scientific classification
- Kingdom: Animalia
- Phylum: Arthropoda
- Clade: Pancrustacea
- Class: Insecta
- Order: Coleoptera
- Suborder: Polyphaga
- Infraorder: Scarabaeiformia
- Family: Scarabaeidae
- Genus: Rufotrichia
- Species: R. rufescens

Binomial name
- Rufotrichia rufescens (Moser, 1912)

Synonyms
- Holotrichia rufescens Moser, 1912; Holotrichia wangerbaoensis Zhang & Li, 1997

Species of beetle

Rufotrichia rufescens is a species of beetle of the family Scarabaeidae. It is found in China (Hubei, Sichuan).

== Description ==
Adults reach a length of about 19 mm (0.75 in). They are similar to Rufotrichia rufula in stature and colouration, but smaller and with the anterior angles of the pronotum scarcely projecting. The pygidium is almost as long as wide and much more sparsely punctate. The colour is reddish-brown, with the head and pronotum slightly darker.
