= Nigrotrichia sauteri =

Scientific classification
- Kingdom: Animalia
- Phylum: Arthropoda
- Clade: Pancrustacea
- Class: Insecta
- Order: Coleoptera
- Suborder: Polyphaga
- Infraorder: Scarabaeiformia
- Family: Scarabaeidae
- Genus: Nigrotrichia
- Species: N. sauteri

Binomial name
- Nigrotrichia sauteri (Moser, 1912)

Synonyms
- Holotrichia sauteri Moser, 1912; Holotrichia sauteri lutaoensis Kobayashi, 1990

Species of beetle

Nigrotrichia sauteri is a species of beetle of the family Scarabaeidae. It is found in China (Ningxia) and Taiwan.

== Description ==
Adults reach a length of about 18–21 mm (0.71–0.83 in). They are very similar to Nigrotrichia kiotonensis, but the punctation of the pronotum is much more extensive and the pit-like punctures are significantly larger and appear elongated on the disc, tapering somewhat posteriorly. The pygidium is somewhat flatter and more sparsely punctate.

== Subspecies ==
- Nigrotrichia sauteri sauteri (Taiwan, China: Ningxia)
- Nigrotrichia sauteri lutaoensis (Kobayashi, 1990) (Taiwan)
