= Holotrichia consanguinea =

Scientific classification
- Kingdom: Animalia
- Phylum: Arthropoda
- Clade: Pancrustacea
- Class: Insecta
- Order: Coleoptera
- Suborder: Polyphaga
- Infraorder: Scarabaeiformia
- Family: Scarabaeidae
- Tribe: Melolonthini
- Genus: Holotrichia
- Species: H. consanguinea

Binomial name
- Holotrichia consanguinea Blanchard, 1850

Species of beetle

Holotrichea consanguinea, also known as the sugarcane beetle, is a beetle belonging to the genus Holotrichia. It causes frequent problems for sugarcane growers in India.

== Description ==
Holotrichea consanguinea is a moderately sized beetle with no horns or spines. During the winter, adults will burrow down into the soil. After it rains for the first time of the year, the beetles will come out and mate, and the female will then bury the eggs. After 7–10 days, the eggs hatch and the larvae start to eat grass and sugarcane roots. After 2 months, the larvae will become fully mature and pupate. When autumn comes, the beetles will go back underground. There is only one generation per year.

== Problems caused ==
When the beetles are still larvae, they will frequently eat sugarcane roots. This causes the sugarcane plant to dry up and die due to the inability to absorb water. Methods of control include flooding sugarcane fields at certain intervals to kill and displace the bug when it is in the ground, spraying fields with pesticides, manually pulling up infested plants, planting the sugarcane early so that the plants will mature earlier, and trapping and killing young larvae. Adults are harmless to crops.
