= Rufotrichia rufula =

Scientific classification
- Kingdom: Animalia
- Phylum: Arthropoda
- Clade: Pancrustacea
- Class: Insecta
- Order: Coleoptera
- Suborder: Polyphaga
- Infraorder: Scarabaeiformia
- Family: Scarabaeidae
- Genus: Rufotrichia
- Species: R. rufula

Binomial name
- Rufotrichia rufula (Moser, 1912)

Synonyms
- Holotrichia rufula Moser, 1912

Species of beetle

Rufotrichia rufula is a species of beetle of the family Scarabaeidae. It is found in Vietnam.

== Description ==
Adults reach a length of about 22–24 mm (0.87–0.94 in). They are very similar to Sophrops iridescens and Rufotrichia montana, but is somewhat smaller, and can be distinguished, apart from its colour, by the fact that the edge of the clypeus is quite strongly upturned at the sides. The colour is a reddish-brown with a violet sheen, with the head and pronotum somewhat darker. The head is wrinkled and punctured, the clypeus weakly emarginate in the middle and less strongly upturned there than at the sides. The pronotum is quite densely covered with umbilical punctures and weakly wrinkled at the sides. It is more than twice as wide as it is long, arched in the middle. Its lateral margins are weakly crenulated, ciliate and brown-fringed, the posterior angles are obtuse, the weakly projecting anterior angles almost right-angled. The anterior margin is bulbous, the posterior margin crenulated. The scutellum is sparsely punctured without a smooth midline. The elytra are moderately densely covered with umbilical punctures, the weakly prominent ribs are almost smooth. The pygidium is somewhat wider than long and rather densely umbilicated. The thorax, except for the narrow central area, is covered with yellow hairs and the abdomen is finely and sparsely punctured in the middle and extremely short setae. On the sides, the punctures are somewhat denser.
