= Sophrops iridescens =

Scientific classification
- Kingdom: Animalia
- Phylum: Arthropoda
- Clade: Pancrustacea
- Class: Insecta
- Order: Coleoptera
- Suborder: Polyphaga
- Infraorder: Scarabaeiformia
- Family: Scarabaeidae
- Genus: Sophrops
- Species: S. iridescens

Binomial name
- Sophrops iridescens (Moser, 1908)

Synonyms
- Holotrichia iridescens Moser, 1908

Species of beetle

Sophrops iridescens is a species of beetle of the family Scarabaeidae. It is found in China (Yunnan) and Vietnam.

== Description ==
Adults reach a length of about 24 mm (0.94 in). They are black and glossy, with a more or less violet sheen. The head is coarsely, somewhat wrinkledly punctured and the antennae are reddish-brown. The pronotum is more than twice as long as wide, fairly densely covered with coarse umbilical punctures, and wrinkled near the lateral margins. It is arched and widened in the middle, with weakly crenate lateral margins. The anterior margin is thickened, the posterior margin strongly crenate, but with a smooth outermost narrow edge. The scutellum has a smooth midline. The elytra are moderately densely covered with umbilical punctures, the intervals weakly wrinkled. The pygidium is weakly convex, only slightly wider than long, and fairly densely punctate with umbilical punctures. The chest is densely punctured and covered with yellowish hairs, except in the center and the abdomen is punctured everywhere in both sexes, though somewhat more densely on the sides.
