= Achloa blandula =

Scientific classification
- Kingdom: Animalia
- Phylum: Arthropoda
- Clade: Pancrustacea
- Class: Insecta
- Order: Coleoptera
- Suborder: Polyphaga
- Infraorder: Scarabaeiformia
- Family: Scarabaeidae
- Genus: Achloa
- Species: A. blandula

Binomial name
- Achloa blandula Péringuey, 1904

Species of beetle

Achloa blandula is a species of beetle of the family Scarabaeidae. It is found in South Africa (Gauteng).

== Description ==
Adults reach a length of about 10–10.5 mm (0.39–0.41 in). They are very similar to Achloa helvola and Achloa delicatula. The colour, size, and vestiture are identical, but the clypeal suture, the upper edge of which is slightly carinate, is transverse, and the clypeus itself is deeply and irregularly punctured, almost scrobiculate. The punctures on the elytra, and especially on the propygidium, pygidium and abdomen are much deeper than in any of the other the species.
