= Clitopa rufiventris =

Scientific classification
- Kingdom: Animalia
- Phylum: Arthropoda
- Class: Insecta
- Order: Coleoptera
- Suborder: Polyphaga
- Infraorder: Scarabaeiformia
- Family: Scarabaeidae
- Genus: Clitopa
- Species: C. rufiventris

Binomial name
- Clitopa rufiventris (Boheman, 1857)

Synonyms
- Onocheta rufiventris Boheman, 1857

Species of beetle

Clitopa rufiventris is a species of beetle of the family Scarabaeidae. It is found in Zimbabwe.

== Description ==
Adults reach a length of about 15–16.5 mm (0.59–0.65 in). They are piceous, with the palpi and often the antennal club piceous-red at the apex. The head and pronotum have the same shape and the same vestiture as Clitopa bohemani, the colour of the pubescence is as a rule greyish, but occasionally it is light fulvous. The elytra are not so depressed in the dorsal part nor are they distinctly narrower across the posterior declivous part as in C. bohemani and Clitopa zambesina, they are also much more shagreened than in these two species, and the greyish appressed hairs springing from the interstices form a denser covering.
