= Achloa echinaticeps =

Scientific classification
- Kingdom: Animalia
- Phylum: Arthropoda
- Clade: Pancrustacea
- Class: Insecta
- Order: Coleoptera
- Suborder: Polyphaga
- Infraorder: Scarabaeiformia
- Family: Scarabaeidae
- Genus: Achloa
- Species: A. echinaticeps

Binomial name
- Achloa echinaticeps Péringuey, 1904

Species of beetle

Achloa echinaticeps is a species of beetle of the family Scarabaeidae. It is found in South Africa (Gauteng).

== Description ==
Adults reach a length of about 11–12 mm (0.43–0.47 in). They are very similar to Achloa helvola. The size, shape, and vestiture are the same and the sculpture is also similar, but the clypeal suture is only moderately arcuate from side to side, while the clypeus itself is a little narrower, slightly attenuated laterally towards the apex, strongly reflexed at the anterior part, the margin of which has a fringe of thick, stiff, spine-like erect cilia, alternately long and short, and is quite impunctate, the frontal part which is very strongly punctate has a double row of similarly stiff bristles along the suture, the basal part, however, is hairy.
