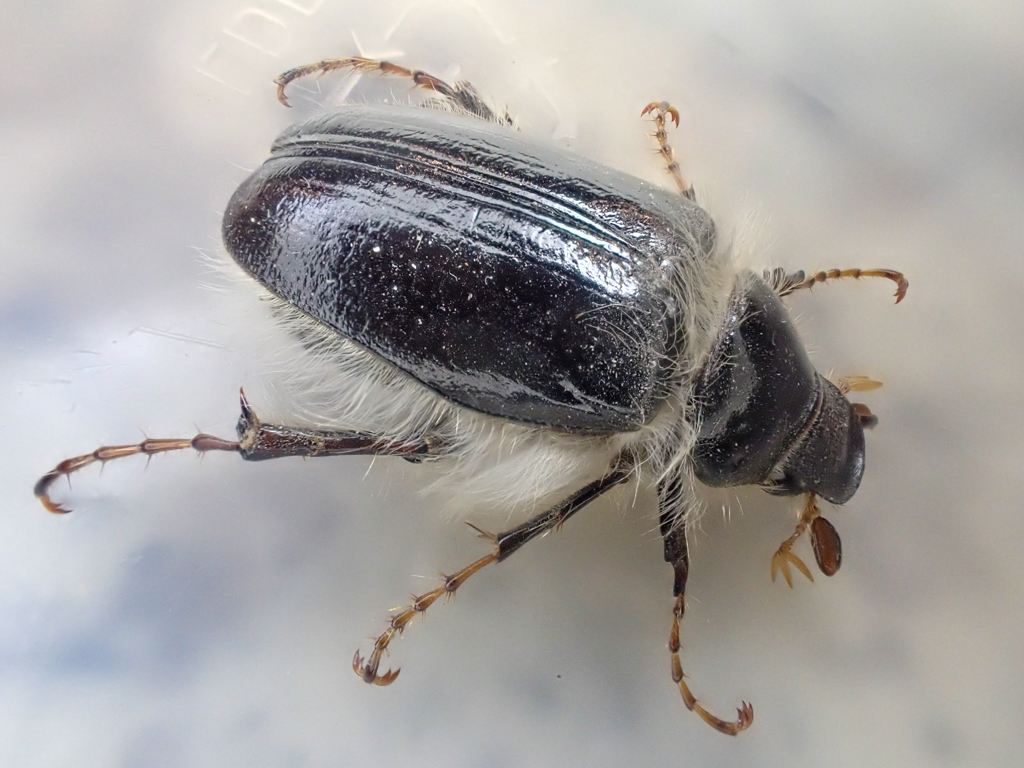
- Phobetus palpalis

Scientific classification
- Kingdom: Animalia
- Phylum: Arthropoda
- Class: Insecta
- Order: Coleoptera
- Suborder: Polyphaga
- Infraorder: Scarabaeiformia
- Family: Scarabaeidae
- Tribe: Tanyproctini
- Genus: Phobetus; LeConte, 1856

= Phobetus =

Genus of beetles

Phobetus is a genus of May beetles and junebugs in the family Scarabaeidae. There are about 11 described species in the genus Phobetus.

== Species ==
These 11 species belong to the genus Phobetus:

- Phobetus chearyi Hardy, 1973
- Phobetus ciliatus Barrett, 1935
- Phobetus comatus LeConte, 1856 (Robinson's rain scarab)
- Phobetus desertus Blom & Clark, 1984
- Phobetus humeralis Cazier, 1937
- Phobetus mojavus Barrett, 1933
- Phobetus palpalis Saylor, 1936
- Phobetus panamintensis Hardy, 1978
- Phobetus saylori Cazier, 1937
- Phobetus sleeperi Hardy, 1978
- Phobetus testaceus LeConte, 1861
