= Aegostheta capicola =

Scientific classification
- Kingdom: Animalia
- Phylum: Arthropoda
- Class: Insecta
- Order: Coleoptera
- Suborder: Polyphaga
- Infraorder: Scarabaeiformia
- Family: Scarabaeidae
- Genus: Aegostheta
- Species: A. capicola

Binomial name
- Aegostheta capicola (Péringuey, 1904)

Synonyms
- Macrophylla capicola Péringuey, 1904

Species of beetle

Aegostheta capicola is a species of beetle of the family Scarabaeidae. It is found in South Africa (Eastern Cape).

== Description ==
Adults reach a length of about 23 mm (0.91 in). They are similar in build and colour to Aegostheta natalensis and also glabrous on the upper side, but differing in the shape of the clypeus, which is nearly straight in front but has the outer angles broadly rounded. The clypeal suture is weakly indicated. Also, the basal angles of the pronotum are sharper, the punctures on the head are much finer, those on the pronotum and elytra are much shallower, and the latter are scarcely coriaceous. The pygidium is briefly pubescent.
