= Achelyna testacea =

Scientific classification
- Kingdom: Animalia
- Phylum: Arthropoda
- Class: Insecta
- Order: Coleoptera
- Suborder: Polyphaga
- Infraorder: Scarabaeiformia
- Family: Scarabaeidae
- Genus: Achelyna
- Species: A. testacea

Binomial name
- Achelyna testacea Péringuey, 1904

Species of beetle

Achelyna testacea is a species of beetle of the family Scarabaeidae. It is found in South Africa (Mpumalanga).

== Description ==
Adults reach a length of about 9.5 mm (0.37 in). They are shaped as Achelyna clypeata, but they are a little larger. The colour is testaceous-red, and the elytra are reddish-yellow. Also, the hairs on the head and along the pronotum are of a lighter yellow. The punctures on the basal part of the clypeus are not quite so conspicuous as in A. clypeata, and the clypeus is straight laterally instead of being somewhat obliquely dilated towards the anterior part. The punctures on the elytra and also the striate costules are similar, but the marginal fringe of hairs is dense and somewhat long.
