= Tanyproctus nitidus =

Scientific classification
- Kingdom: Animalia
- Phylum: Arthropoda
- Class: Insecta
- Order: Coleoptera
- Suborder: Polyphaga
- Infraorder: Scarabaeiformia
- Family: Scarabaeidae
- Genus: Tanyproctus
- Species: T. nitidus

Binomial name
- Tanyproctus nitidus Petrovitz, 1968

Species of beetle

Tanyproctus nitidus is a species of beetle of the family Scarabaeidae. It is found in Iran.

== Description ==
Adults reach a length of about 8.2 mm. They are very similar to Tanyproctus iranicus, but the clypeus is not conically elongated, but broad, almost rectangular, with rounded corners, sparsely punctate, and the vertex also has smaller and rough punctation. The sides of the pronotum are not notched and the punctation is small and sparse. The suture of the elytra is distinctly raised.
