= Periclitopa dubiosula =

Scientific classification
- Kingdom: Animalia
- Phylum: Arthropoda
- Class: Insecta
- Order: Coleoptera
- Suborder: Polyphaga
- Infraorder: Scarabaeiformia
- Family: Scarabaeidae
- Genus: Periclitopa
- Species: P. dubiosula

Binomial name
- Periclitopa dubiosula Péringuey, 1904

Species of beetle

Periclitopa dubiosula is a species of beetle of the family Scarabaeidae. It is found in South Africa (Limpopo).

== Description ==
Adults reach a length of about 15 mm (0.59 in). They are very similar to Periclitopa varicornis and differs mainly in the colour of the antennae, all the joints of which are chestnut-brown. The pubescence of the head, pronotum, and pectus is greyish and equally long, but the elytra are slightly more roughly shagreened and chestnut-brown. The pygidium, underside, and palpi are also chestnut-brown.
