= Clomecyra rikatlensis =

Scientific classification
- Kingdom: Animalia
- Phylum: Arthropoda
- Class: Insecta
- Order: Coleoptera
- Suborder: Polyphaga
- Infraorder: Scarabaeiformia
- Family: Scarabaeidae
- Genus: Clomecyra
- Species: C. rikatlensis

Binomial name
- Clomecyra rikatlensis (Péringuey, 1904)

Synonyms
- Cyclomera rikatlensis Péringuey, 1904

Species of beetle

Clomecyra rikatlensis is a species of beetle of the family Scarabaeidae. It is found in Mozambique.

== Description ==
Adults reach a length of about 20 mm (0.79 in). They are very similar to Diaclaspus delagoensis, but a little more slender. The colour is the same, and so is the general facies, but it differs in the following points: the clypeus is plainly aculeate in the middle of the anterior part, the margin is more reflexed, and the median part of the surface is impunctate, the sides only have some sub-foveate punctures. The frontal part has a longitudinally raised prominence, the transverse ledge on the vertex is very distinct, and the surface is broadly foveate. The pronotum is very finely shagreened and plainly rounded and ampliated in the middle laterally, but it is sinuate in the posterior part with the outer angle sharp, the pubescence is the same as in Cyclomera natalensis. The elytra, however, are very coriaceous instead of being shagreened, and are glabrous except along the outer margins under the humeral and the rounded posterior parts where there are a few appressed, short, fulvous hairs in addition to the marginal fringe, which is rather long.
