= Trichinopus titania =

Scientific classification
- Kingdom: Animalia
- Phylum: Arthropoda
- Class: Insecta
- Order: Coleoptera
- Suborder: Polyphaga
- Infraorder: Scarabaeiformia
- Family: Scarabaeidae
- Genus: Trichinopus
- Species: T. titania

Binomial name
- Trichinopus titania Péringuey, 1904

Species of beetle

Trichinopus titania is a species of beetle of the family Scarabaeidae. It is found in Namibia.

== Description ==
Adults reach a length of about 9 mm (0.35 in). They are similar in shape to Trichinopus flavipennis, but differing not only in the colouring (the body being fuscous with the elytra also straw-coloured), but the clypeus is a little shorter, more broadly rounded laterally in front, the clypeal carina is visible in the centre only, the piceous antennal club is shorter than the whole pedicel, the marginal fringe of hairs on the elytra is much shorter, and so is the pubescence on the underside, nor are the hind legs bristling with so many erect hairs.
