= Diaclaspus =

Scientific classification
- Kingdom: Animalia
- Phylum: Arthropoda
- Class: Insecta
- Order: Coleoptera
- Suborder: Polyphaga
- Infraorder: Scarabaeiformia
- Family: Scarabaeidae
- Subfamily: Melolonthinae
- Tribe: Tanyproctini
- Genus: Diaclaspus; Brenske, 1896

Genus of leaf beetles

Diaclaspus is a genus of beetle of the family Scarabaeidae.

== Species ==
- Diaclaspus crinitus Arrow, 1902
- Diaclaspus delagoensis Brenske, 1896
