= Perrindema quiterajoensis =

Scientific classification
- Kingdom: Animalia
- Phylum: Arthropoda
- Clade: Pancrustacea
- Class: Insecta
- Order: Coleoptera
- Suborder: Polyphaga
- Infraorder: Scarabaeiformia
- Family: Scarabaeidae
- Genus: Perrindema
- Species: P. quiterajoensis

Binomial name
- Perrindema quiterajoensis Lacroix & Montreuil, 2013

Species of beetle

Perrindema quiterajoensis is a species of beetle of the family Scarabaeidae. It is found in Mozambique.

== Description ==
Adults reach a length of about 15 mm (0.59 in). They have a slightly elongated body and a lighter brown colour compared to other Perrindema species.
