= Falsotoclinius richteri =

Scientific classification
- Kingdom: Animalia
- Phylum: Arthropoda
- Class: Insecta
- Order: Coleoptera
- Suborder: Polyphaga
- Infraorder: Scarabaeiformia
- Family: Scarabaeidae
- Genus: Falsotoclinius
- Species: F. richteri

Binomial name
- Falsotoclinius richteri (Petrovitz, 1958)

Synonyms
- Otoclinius richteri Petrovitz, 1958

Species of beetle

Falsotoclinius richteri is a species of beetle of the family Scarabaeidae. It is found in southern Iran.

== Description ==
Adults reach a length of about 6.5–8.5 mm. They have a yellowish-brown, subparallel body. The clypeus has an almost flat base and is regularly punctate. The frons and vertex are black. The anterior margin of the pronotum has no cilia, except laterally near the angles.
