= Perrindema ibiense =

Scientific classification
- Kingdom: Animalia
- Phylum: Arthropoda
- Clade: Pancrustacea
- Class: Insecta
- Order: Coleoptera
- Suborder: Polyphaga
- Infraorder: Scarabaeiformia
- Family: Scarabaeidae
- Genus: Perrindema
- Species: P. ibiense

Binomial name
- Perrindema ibiense Lacroix, 1997

Species of beetle

Perrindema ibiense is a species of beetle of the family Scarabaeidae. It is found in Mozambique.

== Description ==
Adults reach a length of about 17 mm (0.67 in). They have an elongated body, with a uniform chestnut brown colour.
