= Atanyproctus =

Scientific classification
- Kingdom: Animalia
- Phylum: Arthropoda
- Clade: Pancrustacea
- Class: Insecta
- Order: Coleoptera
- Suborder: Polyphaga
- Infraorder: Scarabaeiformia
- Family: Scarabaeidae
- Subfamily: Melolonthinae
- Tribe: Tanyproctini
- Genus: Atanyproctus; Petrovitz, 1954

Genus of leaf beetles

Atanyproctus is a genus of beetles belonging to the family Scarabaeidae.

== Species ==
- Atanyproctus afghanus Petrovitz, 1968
- Atanyproctus alexandri Petrovitz, 1965
- Atanyproctus ernae Petrovitz, 1980
- Atanyproctus miksici Petrovitz, 1965
- Atanyproctus opacipennis Petrovitz, 1968
- Atanyproctus simplicitarsis Petrovitz, 1954
