= Pimelomera schwetzi =

Scientific classification
- Kingdom: Animalia
- Phylum: Arthropoda
- Clade: Pancrustacea
- Class: Insecta
- Order: Coleoptera
- Suborder: Polyphaga
- Infraorder: Scarabaeiformia
- Family: Scarabaeidae
- Genus: Pimelomera
- Species: P. schwetzi

Binomial name
- Pimelomera schwetzi Moser, 1924

Species of beetle

Pimelomera schwetzi is a species of beetle of the family Scarabaeidae. It is found in the Democratic Republic of the Congo.

== Description ==
Adults reach a length of about 15 mm (0.59 in). They have an oblong, parallel-sided, cylindrical body. They are dark brown above, and reddish-brown below.
