= Clomecyra =

Scientific classification
- Kingdom: Animalia
- Phylum: Arthropoda
- Class: Insecta
- Order: Coleoptera
- Suborder: Polyphaga
- Infraorder: Scarabaeiformia
- Family: Scarabaeidae
- Subfamily: Melolonthinae
- Tribe: Tanyproctini
- Genus: Clomecyra; Lacroix, 1999

Genus of leaf beetles

Clomecyra is a genus of beetles of the family Scarabaeidae.

== Species ==
- Clomecyra rikatlensis (Péringuey, 1904)
- Clomecyra ballerioi Lacroix, 2002
