= Cyclomera dispar =

Scientific classification
- Kingdom: Animalia
- Phylum: Arthropoda
- Class: Insecta
- Order: Coleoptera
- Suborder: Polyphaga
- Infraorder: Scarabaeiformia
- Family: Scarabaeidae
- Genus: Cyclomera
- Species: C. dispar

Binomial name
- Cyclomera dispar Klug, 1855

Species of beetle

Cyclomera dispar is a species of beetle of the family Scarabaeidae. It is found in Mozambique.

== Description ==
Adults reach a length of about 17.5–20 mm (0.69–0.79 in). Males are fuscous, with the under side, antennae and legs piceous or fuscous and with the sides of the pronotum, elytra and abdomen testaceous-red. The head and clypeus are covered with deep, almost contiguous punctures separated by sharp walls, and briefly pubescent. Females differ from the males in colour and clothing, particularly in the structure of the legs. Furthermore, the antennal club is relatively smaller and dark. They are also more convex, and the colour is not black, but light chestnut-brown, the punctures are weaker, the hairy clothing is reddish-yellow, and less distinct above than underneath and at the sides.
