= Falsotoclinius fragilis =

Scientific classification
- Kingdom: Animalia
- Phylum: Arthropoda
- Class: Insecta
- Order: Coleoptera
- Suborder: Polyphaga
- Infraorder: Scarabaeiformia
- Family: Scarabaeidae
- Genus: Falsotoclinius
- Species: F. fragilis

Binomial name
- Falsotoclinius fragilis (Petrovitz, 1958)

Synonyms
- Otoclinius fragilis Petrovitz, 1958

Species of beetle

Falsotoclinius fragilis is a species of beetle of the family Scarabaeidae. It is found in southern Iran.

== Description ==
Adults reach a length of about 6–8.5 mm. They have a light yellowish-brown, subparallel body. The clypeus is flat and sparsely but coarsely punctate, with a shiny center. The anterior margin of the pronotum is ciliate, but indistinctly so in the middle.
