= Trichinopus polygonus =

Scientific classification
- Kingdom: Animalia
- Phylum: Arthropoda
- Class: Insecta
- Order: Coleoptera
- Suborder: Polyphaga
- Infraorder: Scarabaeiformia
- Family: Scarabaeidae
- Genus: Trichinopus
- Species: T. polygonus

Binomial name
- Trichinopus polygonus Frey, 1966

Species of beetle

Trichinopus polygonus is a species of beetle of the family Scarabaeidae. It is found in Namibia.

== Description ==
Adults reach a length of about 5.5 mm for males and 6.5 mm for females. The head, pronotum, underside and pygidium are brownish-black, while the elytra are yellowish-brown, with the lateral margins and sutural striae brown. The legs and antennae are also brown. The underside is covered with long, dense, light-colored hairs and the legs have particularly long brown hairs. The lateral margins of the pronotum and elytra are fringed with long, light-coloured hairs. On the disc and anterior margin of the pronotum, as well as on the head, there are only a few long, light-coloured hairs.
