= Falsotoclinius nikodymi =

Scientific classification
- Kingdom: Animalia
- Phylum: Arthropoda
- Class: Insecta
- Order: Coleoptera
- Suborder: Polyphaga
- Infraorder: Scarabaeiformia
- Family: Scarabaeidae
- Genus: Falsotoclinius
- Species: F. nikodymi

Binomial name
- Falsotoclinius nikodymi Keith, 2007

Species of beetle

Falsotoclinius nikodymi is a species of beetle of the family Scarabaeidae. It is found in Pakistan.

== Description ==
Adults reach a length of about 5.9–6.3 mm. They are entirely yellowish-brown, except for the margins of the clypeus, the frons and the vertex, which are a darker reddish-brown, and the lighter antennal club.

== Etymology ==
The species is named after M. Milan Nikodym.
