= Neoclitopa nitidipennis =

Scientific classification
- Kingdom: Animalia
- Phylum: Arthropoda
- Class: Insecta
- Order: Coleoptera
- Suborder: Polyphaga
- Infraorder: Scarabaeiformia
- Family: Scarabaeidae
- Genus: Neoclitopa
- Species: N. nitidipennis

Binomial name
- Neoclitopa nitidipennis (Arrow, 1902)

Synonyms
- Clitopa nitidipennis Arrow, 1902

Species of beetle

Neoclitopa nitidipennis is a species of beetle of the family Scarabaeidae. It is found in Mozambique.

== Description ==
Adults reach a length of about 16–19 mm (0.63–0.75 in). They have an elongated body, with fairly parallel elytral sides. The forebody is blackish, while the elytra are chestnut-brown. There are dense hairs on the pronotum.
