= Onochaeta =

Scientific classification
- Kingdom: Animalia
- Phylum: Arthropoda
- Class: Insecta
- Order: Coleoptera
- Suborder: Polyphaga
- Infraorder: Scarabaeiformia
- Family: Scarabaeidae
- Subfamily: Melolonthinae
- Tribe: Tanyproctini
- Genus: Onochaeta; Erichson, 1847
- Species: O. porcata

Binomial name
- Onochaeta porcata (Swartz, 1817)

Synonyms
- Onocheta Boheman, 1857; Melolontha porcata Swartz, 1817

Genus of beetles

Onochaeta is a genus of beetle of the family Scarabaeidae. It is monotypic, being represented by the single species, Onochaeta porcata, which is found in South Africa.

== Description ==
Adults reach a length of about 18 mm (0.71 in). They are piceous, with the club of the antennae slightly reddish-brown. The head, pronotum, pectus, and abdomen are clothed with a somewhat light fulvous pubescence longer on the sides and base of the thorax, and also on the pectus. The intervals of the elytra are filled with somewhat long, scale-like greyish fulvous scales. The pronotum is plainly ampliated laterally in the middle, deeply punctured, with the punctures larger and less closely set in the anterior part, and having a longitudinal impression in the median part only of the disk. The scutellum is moderately closely punctured, except in the apical part. The elytra are strongly quadri-costate on each side, and with the suture also highly raised, the punctures are nearly smooth and shining, and the intervals, as well as the outer margin, are covered with scale-like appressed hairs springing from somewhat shallow punctures. The pygidium is punctulate, and clothed, like the abdomen, with appressed hairs, and has a fringe of longer ones along the outer margin.
