= Trichinopus =

Scientific classification
- Kingdom: Animalia
- Phylum: Arthropoda
- Class: Insecta
- Order: Coleoptera
- Suborder: Polyphaga
- Infraorder: Scarabaeiformia
- Family: Scarabaeidae
- Subfamily: Melolonthinae
- Tribe: Tanyproctini
- Genus: Trichinopus; Waterhouse, 1875

Synonyms
- Deuterohapalopus Dalla Torre, 1913; Damara Péringuey, 1908; Hapalopus Brenske, 1903

Genus of leaf beetles

Trichinopus is a genus of beetles belonging to the family Scarabaeidae.

== Species ==
- Trichinopus chuni (Brenske, 1903)
- Trichinopus flavipennis Waterhouse, 1875
- Trichinopus picipennis Arrow, 1936
- Trichinopus polygonus Frey, 1966
- Trichinopus puncticollis Frey, 1963
- Trichinopus rufescens Arrow, 1936
- Trichinopus titania Péringuey, 1904
- Trichinopus villosulus (Péringuey, 1908)
