= Tlaocera =

Scientific classification
- Kingdom: Animalia
- Phylum: Arthropoda
- Clade: Pancrustacea
- Class: Insecta
- Order: Coleoptera
- Suborder: Polyphaga
- Infraorder: Scarabaeiformia
- Family: Scarabaeidae
- Subfamily: Melolonthinae
- Tribe: Tanyproctini
- Genus: Tlaocera; Péringuey, 1904
- Species: T. saga

Binomial name
- Tlaocera saga Péringuey, 1904

Genus of beetles

Tlaocera is a genus of beetle of the family Scarabaeidae. It is monotypic, being represented by the single species, Tlaocera saga, which is found in South Africa (Western Cape).

== Description ==
Adults reach a length of about 12.5 mm (0.49 in). They are black, with the elytra and antennae chestnut-brown, and the frontal part, pronotum, scutellum, pectus, and femora clothed with long, dense fulvous hairs. The clypeus has a double row of deep punctures on the anterior part, but is smooth along the suture, and the frontal part is deeply punctured, each puncture bearing a long hair. The pronotum is somewhat deeply impressed in the anterior part, which is also a little more closely punctured than the posterior part where the punctures are more scattered but equally deep. The elytra are somewhat depressed in the dorsal part, and have on each side, in addition to the plain juxta-sutural stria, two dorsal geminate somewhat indistinct ones, they are punctulate and have faint longitudinal rows of wider but shallow punctures. The pygidium is deeply but not closely punctate in the basal part, nearly impunctate in the apical.
