= Tanyproctus farsensis =

Scientific classification
- Kingdom: Animalia
- Phylum: Arthropoda
- Clade: Pancrustacea
- Class: Insecta
- Order: Coleoptera
- Suborder: Polyphaga
- Infraorder: Scarabaeiformia
- Family: Scarabaeidae
- Genus: Tanyproctus
- Species: T. farsensis

Binomial name
- Tanyproctus farsensis Keith, 2009

Species of beetle

Tanyproctus farsensis is a species of beetle of the family Scarabaeidae. It is found in Iran.

== Description ==
Adults reach a length of about 11.2 mm. They are entirely dark red, with the antennae and outer margins of the appendages darker and the pygidium lighter.

== Etymology ==
The species name refers to its geographic origin, Fars province in Iran.
