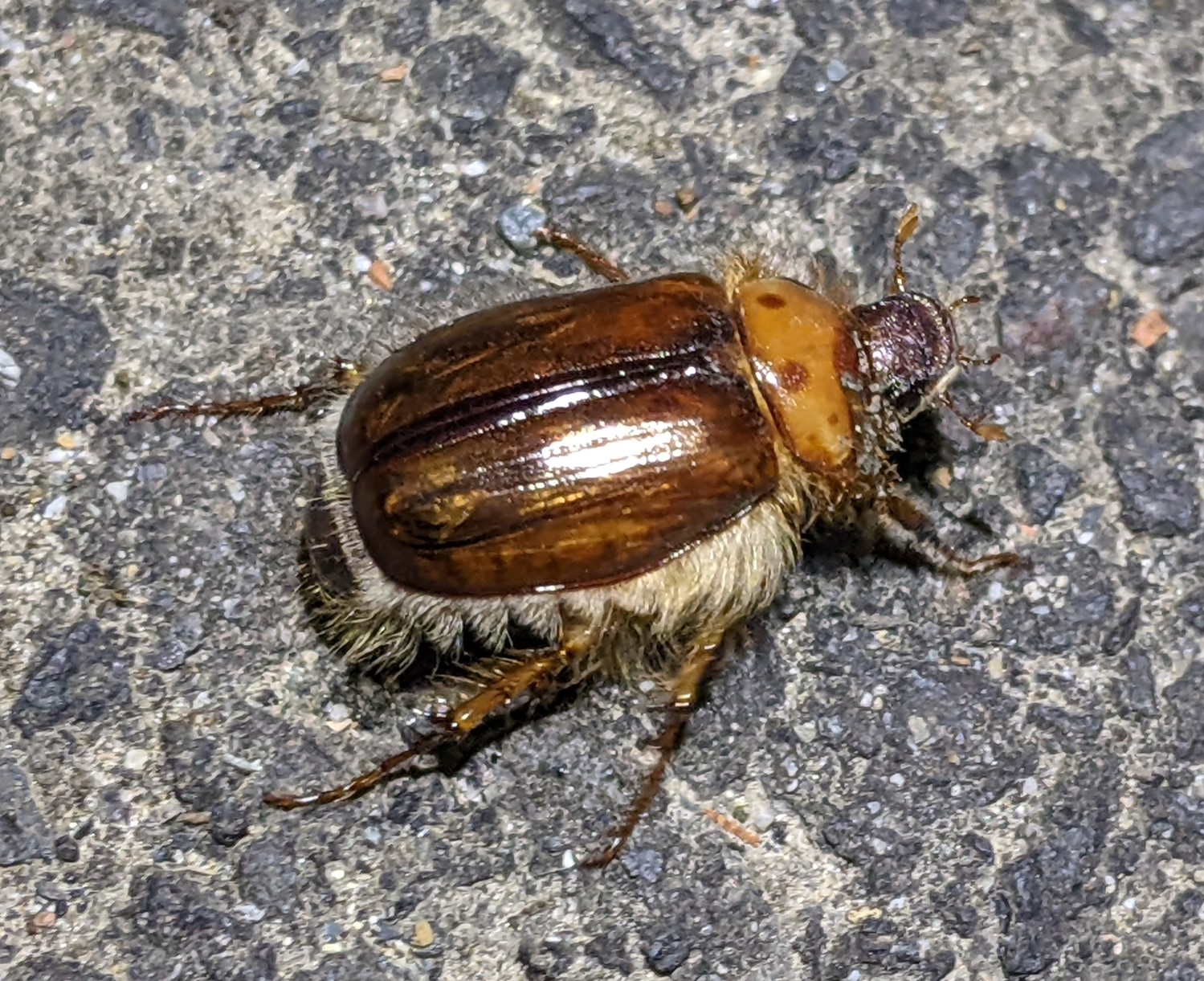

Scientific classification
- Kingdom: Animalia
- Phylum: Arthropoda
- Class: Insecta
- Order: Coleoptera
- Suborder: Polyphaga
- Infraorder: Scarabaeiformia
- Family: Scarabaeidae
- Genus: Phobetus
- Species: P. comatus

Binomial name
- Phobetus comatus LeConte, 1856

Synonyms
- Phobetus centralis Casey, 1909; Phobetus leachi Barrett, 1935; Phobetus robinsoni Saylor, 1939; Phobetus sloopi Barrett, 1933

= Phobetus comatus =

Species of beetle

Phobetus comatus, commonly known as Robinson's rain scarab, is a species of scarab beetle in the family Scarabaeidae. It is found in North America.
