= Atanyproctus opacipennis =

Scientific classification
- Kingdom: Animalia
- Phylum: Arthropoda
- Class: Insecta
- Order: Coleoptera
- Suborder: Polyphaga
- Infraorder: Scarabaeiformia
- Family: Scarabaeidae
- Genus: Atanyproctus
- Species: A. opacipennis

Binomial name
- Atanyproctus opacipennis Petrovitz, 1968

Species of beetle

Atanyproctus opacipennis is a species of beetle of the family Scarabaeidae. It is found in Iran.

== Description ==
Adults reach a length of about 9.2 mm. They have a narrow, almost parallel, dark reddish-brown body. The head, pronotum and scutellum are shiny, while the elytra are dull.
