= Tanyproctus poggii =

Scientific classification
- Kingdom: Animalia
- Phylum: Arthropoda
- Clade: Pancrustacea
- Class: Insecta
- Order: Coleoptera
- Suborder: Polyphaga
- Infraorder: Scarabaeiformia
- Family: Scarabaeidae
- Genus: Tanyproctus
- Species: T. poggii

Binomial name
- Tanyproctus poggii Keith, 2009

Species of beetle

Tanyproctus poggii is a species of beetle of the family Scarabaeidae. It is found in China (Yunnan).

== Description ==
Adults reach a length of about 11.3 mm. They have an elongated, entirely blackish body, the elytra with a very slight pruinose sheen.

== Etymology ==
The species is named in honour of Dr Roberto Poggi.
