= Falsotoclinius sehnali =

Scientific classification
- Kingdom: Animalia
- Phylum: Arthropoda
- Class: Insecta
- Order: Coleoptera
- Suborder: Polyphaga
- Infraorder: Scarabaeiformia
- Family: Scarabaeidae
- Genus: Falsotoclinius
- Species: F. sehnali

Binomial name
- Falsotoclinius sehnali Keith, 2007

Species of beetle

Falsotoclinius sehnali is a species of beetle of the family Scarabaeidae. It is found in Pakistan.

== Description ==
Adults reach a length of about 6.7–11 mm. The forebody is darker than the elytra and the head is reddish-brown to blackish. The pronotum has a broad central reddish-brown area, and the margins of the pronotum and scutellum have a brownish-yellow disc and blackish margins. The elytra are brownish-yellow except for the lateral margins, which are blackish-brown, and the suture, which is narrowly blackish.

== Etymology ==
The species is named after M. Richard Sehnal.
