= Oedanomerus pilosus =

Scientific classification
- Kingdom: Animalia
- Phylum: Arthropoda
- Class: Insecta
- Order: Coleoptera
- Suborder: Polyphaga
- Infraorder: Scarabaeiformia
- Family: Scarabaeidae
- Genus: Oedanomerus
- Species: O. pilosus

Binomial name
- Oedanomerus pilosus Frey, 1960

Species of beetle

Oedanomerus pilosus is a species of beetle of the family Scarabaeidae. It is found in Mozambique and Namibia.

== Description ==
Adults reach a length of about 7 mm. The upper and lower surfaces are blackish-brown, while the elytra and legs, antennae and palps are brown to blackish-brown. Both the upper and lower surface are covered with very long, light hairs. On the underside, the hairs are denser and longer than on the elytra. The sides and the anterior margin of the pronotum are also covered with longer hairs.
