= Canudema homhil =

Scientific classification
- Kingdom: Animalia
- Phylum: Arthropoda
- Class: Insecta
- Order: Coleoptera
- Suborder: Polyphaga
- Infraorder: Scarabaeiformia
- Family: Scarabaeidae
- Genus: Canudema
- Species: C. homhil

Binomial name
- Canudema homhil Král, Sehnal & Bezděk, 2012

Species of beetle

Canudema homhil is a species of beetle of the family Scarabaeidae. It is found in Yemen (Socotra).

== Description ==
Adults reach a length of about 11.7–15.3 mm. They have an elongate, almost parallel, black body, with the extremities and elytra dark brownish. The pronotum and elytra are finely whitish tomentose, with small whitish hairs.

== Etymology ==
The species is named for the area of origin of the species, the Homhil basin.
