= Tanyproctus jordaniacus =

Scientific classification
- Kingdom: Animalia
- Phylum: Arthropoda
- Class: Insecta
- Order: Coleoptera
- Suborder: Polyphaga
- Infraorder: Scarabaeiformia
- Family: Scarabaeidae
- Genus: Tanyproctus
- Species: T. jordaniacus

Binomial name
- Tanyproctus jordaniacus Baraud, 1990

Species of beetle

Tanyproctus jordaniacus is a species of beetle of the family Scarabaeidae. It is found in Jordan.

== Description ==
Adults reach a length of about 15–17 mm. They are light reddish-brown, with the head and pronotum sometimes slightly darker. The upper surface is glabrous. The head is slightly dull, while the pronotum and elytra are very shiny.
