= Tanyproctus batangicus =

Scientific classification
- Kingdom: Animalia
- Phylum: Arthropoda
- Clade: Pancrustacea
- Class: Insecta
- Order: Coleoptera
- Suborder: Polyphaga
- Infraorder: Scarabaeiformia
- Family: Scarabaeidae
- Genus: Tanyproctus
- Species: T. batangicus

Binomial name
- Tanyproctus batangicus Keith, 2009

Species of beetle

Tanyproctus batangicus is a species of beetle of the family Scarabaeidae. It is found in China (Sichuan).

== Description ==
Adults reach a length of about 10 mm. They have an oval, shiny, entirely blackish body, with the appendages partly slightly lighter.

== Etymology ==
The species name refers to its type location, Batang in Sichuan (China).
