= Clitopa rojkoffi =

Scientific classification
- Kingdom: Animalia
- Phylum: Arthropoda
- Clade: Pancrustacea
- Class: Insecta
- Order: Coleoptera
- Suborder: Polyphaga
- Infraorder: Scarabaeiformia
- Family: Scarabaeidae
- Genus: Clitopa
- Species: C. rojkoffi

Binomial name
- Clitopa rojkoffi Lacroix & Montreuil, 2019

Species of beetle

Clitopa rojkoffi is a species of beetle of the family Scarabaeidae. It is found in Zambia.

== Description ==
Adults reach a length of about 12–14 mm (0.47–0.55 in). They have a slightly elongated body. The forebody is blackish and heavily hairy, while the elytra are chestnut brown and the legs blackish.
