= Trichinopus puncticollis =

Scientific classification
- Kingdom: Animalia
- Phylum: Arthropoda
- Class: Insecta
- Order: Coleoptera
- Suborder: Polyphaga
- Infraorder: Scarabaeiformia
- Family: Scarabaeidae
- Genus: Trichinopus
- Species: T. puncticollis

Binomial name
- Trichinopus puncticollis Frey, 1963

Species of beetle

Trichinopus puncticollis is a species of beetle of the family Scarabaeidae. It is found in Botswana, Namibia and South Africa (Transvaal).

== Description ==
Adults reach a length of about 6–7 mm. The upper and lower surfaces are pale yellow, while the clypeus and pronotum are reddish-yellow and the frons and vertex are blackish-brown. The legs and antennae range from pale yellow to brownish-yellow. The clypeus has a narrow dark margin. The entire body, but especially the underside and legs, is covered with long yellowish hairs.
