= Aegostheta vestita =

Scientific classification
- Kingdom: Animalia
- Phylum: Arthropoda
- Class: Insecta
- Order: Coleoptera
- Suborder: Polyphaga
- Infraorder: Scarabaeiformia
- Family: Scarabaeidae
- Genus: Aegostheta
- Species: A. vestita

Binomial name
- Aegostheta vestita (Péringuey, 1904)

Synonyms
- Pleiophylla vestita Péringuey, 1904

Species of beetle

Aegostheta vestita is a species of beetle of the family Scarabaeidae. It is found in South Africa (Eastern Cape).

== Description ==
Adults reach a length of about 15 mm (0.59 in). They are fuscous, with the elytra and antennae light chestnut-red and the legs reddish-brown. The clypeus and head have a few greyish hairs, while the pronotum and scutellum are clothed with a dense, long, appressed flavous pubescence. The elytra are sprinkled with numerous greyish flavescent, short, appressed hairs. The pygidium and abdomen have appressed, closely set hairs.
