= Aegostheta longicornis =

Scientific classification
- Kingdom: Animalia
- Phylum: Arthropoda
- Class: Insecta
- Order: Coleoptera
- Suborder: Polyphaga
- Infraorder: Scarabaeiformia
- Family: Scarabaeidae
- Genus: Aegostheta
- Species: A. longicornis

Binomial name
- Aegostheta longicornis (Fabricius, 1787)

Synonyms
- Melolontha longicornis Fabricius, 1787

Species of beetle

Aegostheta longicornis is a species of beetle of the family Scarabaeidae. It is found in South Africa (Eastern Cape).

== Description ==
Adults reach a length of about 13–15 mm (0.51–0.59 in). They are black, brownish-red elytra, black legs and chestnut-red antennae and palpi. The upper surface is glabrous, except for a fringe of flavescent hairs along the base. The pronotum is deeply and closely punctured, and has a median longitudinal groove-like impression in the anterior part. The scutellum is deeply punctured. The elytra have on each side two somewhat faint costules, covered with deep, slightly irregular punctures separated by raised intervals giving them a coriaceous appearance. The pygidium is covered, like the abdomen, with a flavescent, short pubescence.
