= Socotraproctus =

Scientific classification
- Kingdom: Animalia
- Phylum: Arthropoda
- Class: Insecta
- Order: Coleoptera
- Suborder: Polyphaga
- Infraorder: Scarabaeiformia
- Family: Scarabaeidae
- Subfamily: Melolonthinae
- Tribe: Tanyproctini
- Genus: Socotraproctus; Král, Sehnal & Bezděk, 2012
- Species: S. haghier

Binomial name
- Socotraproctus haghier Král, Sehnal & Bezděk, 2012

Genus of beetles

Socotraproctus is a genus of beetle of the family Scarabaeidae. It is monotypic, being represented by the single species, Socotraproctus haghier, which is found in Yemen (Socotra).

== Description ==
Adults reach a length of about 14.5–16.8 mm for males and 18.6–21.7 mm for females. They have an elongate, black body. The dorsal surface are moderately shiny, with pale to whitish macrosetation.

== Etymology ==
The species is named for the area of origin of the species, the Haghier massif.
