= Perrindema =

Scientific classification
- Kingdom: Animalia
- Phylum: Arthropoda
- Clade: Pancrustacea
- Class: Insecta
- Order: Coleoptera
- Suborder: Polyphaga
- Infraorder: Scarabaeiformia
- Family: Scarabaeidae
- Subfamily: Melolonthinae
- Tribe: Tanyproctini
- Genus: Perrindema; Lacroix, 1997

Synonyms
- Zanitanus Lacroix, 2001

Genus of leaf beetles

Perrindema is a genus of beetles belonging to the family Scarabaeidae.

== Species ==
- Perrindema genieri Lacroix & Montreuil, 2017
- Perrindema ibiense Lacroix, 1997
- Perrindema lindiensis (Moser, 1919)
- Perrindema pembaensis Lacroix & Montreuil, 2013
- Perrindema quiterajoensis Lacroix & Montreuil, 2013
