= Trichiodera =

Scientific classification
- Kingdom: Animalia
- Phylum: Arthropoda
- Class: Insecta
- Order: Coleoptera
- Suborder: Polyphaga
- Infraorder: Scarabaeiformia
- Family: Scarabaeidae
- Subfamily: Melolonthinae
- Tribe: Tanyproctini
- Genus: Trichiodera; Burmeister, 1855
- Species: T. bicarinita

Binomial name
- Trichiodera bicarinita (Gyllenhal, 1817)

Synonyms
- Melolontha bicarinita Gyllenhal, 1817

Genus of beetles

Trichiodera is a genus of beetle of the family Scarabaeidae. It is monotypic, being represented by the single species, Trichiodera bicarinita, which is found in South Africa (Eastern Cape).

== Description ==
Adults reach a length of about 11 mm (0.43 in). They are testaceous-red, with the forehead, pronotum, scutellum and pectus clothed with a dense, long, flavous pubescence. The club of the antennae is flavous. The elytra are glabrous but with an outer marginal fringe of ciliate hairs, deeply and equally punctured, and without costules or striae, not even a juxta-sutural one. The propygidium and pygidium are almost impunctate, the latter fringed with long hairs.
