= Aegostheta maritima =

Scientific classification
- Kingdom: Animalia
- Phylum: Arthropoda
- Class: Insecta
- Order: Coleoptera
- Suborder: Polyphaga
- Infraorder: Scarabaeiformia
- Family: Scarabaeidae
- Genus: Aegostheta
- Species: A. maritima

Binomial name
- Aegostheta maritima (Burmeister, 1855)

Synonyms
- Macrophylla maritima Burmeister, 1855; Macrophylla robusta Erichson, 1848

Species of beetle

Aegostheta maritima is a species of beetle of the family Scarabaeidae. It is found in South Africa (Eastern Cape).

== Description ==
Adults reach a length of about 31–33 mm (1.2–1.3 in). Males are fuscous-brown with the elytra chestnut-brown, the head and also the sides of the pronotum have a very short, somewhat greyish, inconspicuous pubescence, the elytra are glabrous. The whole head is very finely and very closely punctured and the pronotum is as finely and as closely punctured as the head and has a plain longitudinal groove in the anterior part. The scutellum is very finely punctulate and the elytra are somewhat coarsely punctured, plainly coriaceous, and with three fairly distinct striae on each side, in addition to the sutural stria. The pygidium and abdomen are clothed with a very short appressed pubescence. Females are more massive than males and have the elytra deeply sinuate laterally in front of the median part, and conspicuously ampliated thence. Also, the punctures on the pronotum are deeper and broader, and the median impressed line is continued further towards the base. The elytra are not so coriaceous, and the punctures are equally deep but rounder, with the dorsal striae obliterated, and the sutural one ill-defined.
