= Pasaphylla =

Scientific classification
- Kingdom: Animalia
- Phylum: Arthropoda
- Clade: Pancrustacea
- Class: Insecta
- Order: Coleoptera
- Suborder: Polyphaga
- Infraorder: Scarabaeiformia
- Family: Scarabaeidae
- Subfamily: Melolonthinae
- Tribe: Tanyproctini
- Genus: Pasaphylla; Péringuey, 1904
- Species: P. libens

Binomial name
- Pasaphylla libens Péringuey, 1904

Genus of beetles

Pasaphylla is a genus of beetle of the family Scarabaeidae. It is monotypic, being represented by the single species, Pasaphylla libens, which is found in South Africa (Northern Cape).

== Description ==
Adults reach a length of about 17–21.5 mm (0.67–0.85 in). They are testaceous or light chestnut-brown, with the club of the antennae flavous, and the head, pronotum, scutellum and pectus clothed with a very dense and long flavous pubescence. The head is deeply and broadly punctured, the punctures nearly contiguous, and separated from each other by a sharp wall. The elytra are covered with fine irregularly disposed but somewhat closely set punctures each bearing a minute greyish-fulvous appressed hair, the juxta-sutural stria is distinct only in the anterior part, and there are two dorsal very faint costules on each side. The propygidium is covered with fine punctures each bearing a fine, short, appressed flavescent hair and the pygidium is also clothed with a short, appressed pubescence.
