= Scaphorhina =

Scientific classification
- Kingdom: Animalia
- Phylum: Arthropoda
- Class: Insecta
- Order: Coleoptera
- Suborder: Polyphaga
- Infraorder: Scarabaeiformia
- Family: Scarabaeidae
- Subfamily: Melolonthinae
- Tribe: Tanyproctini
- Genus: Scaphorhina; Quedenfeldt, 1884

Synonyms
- Aipeiopsis Péringuey, 1904

Genus of leaf beetles

Scaphorhina is a genus of beetles belonging to the family Scarabaeidae.

== Species ==
- Scaphorhina colmanti Brenske, 1899
- Scaphorhina crinipes Quedenfeldt, 1884
- Scaphorhina echanticeps (Evans, 1987)
- Scaphorhina elachista (Evans, 1987)
- Scaphorhina hirsuta (Péringuey, 1904)
- Scaphorhina hirticollis (Waterhouse, 1875)
- Scaphorhina laeviceps (Moser, 1924)
- Scaphorhina rugipennis (Harold, 1878)
- Scaphorhina schoolmeestersi Lacroix, 2011
