= Achloa =

Scientific classification
- Kingdom: Animalia
- Phylum: Arthropoda
- Class: Insecta
- Order: Coleoptera
- Suborder: Polyphaga
- Infraorder: Scarabaeiformia
- Family: Scarabaeidae
- Subfamily: Melolonthinae
- Tribe: Tanyproctini
- Genus: Achloa; Erichson, 1840

Synonyms
- Nanarcta Blanchard, 1851

Genus of leaf beetles

Achloa is a genus of beetles belonging to the family Scarabaeidae.

== Species ==
- Achloa blandula Péringuey, 1904
- Achloa caffra Erichson, 1840
- Achloa delicatula Péringuey, 1904
- Achloa echinaticeps Péringuey, 1904
- Achloa helvola Erichson, 1840
- Achloa payoni Lacroix, 1997
