= Cephaloncheres =

Scientific classification
- Kingdom: Animalia
- Phylum: Arthropoda
- Clade: Pancrustacea
- Class: Insecta
- Order: Coleoptera
- Suborder: Polyphaga
- Infraorder: Scarabaeiformia
- Family: Scarabaeidae
- Subfamily: Melolonthinae
- Tribe: Tanyproctini
- Genus: Cephaloncheres; Brenske, 1898

Genus of leaf beetles

Cephaloncheres is a genus of beetles belonging to the family Scarabaeidae.

== Species ==
- Cephaloncheres affinis Moser, 1919
- Cephaloncheres lizleri Lacroix, 2001
- Cephaloncheres ugogoensis Brenske, 1898
- Cephaloncheres werneri Lacroix, 2001
