= Perrindema lindiensis =

Scientific classification
- Kingdom: Animalia
- Phylum: Arthropoda
- Clade: Pancrustacea
- Class: Insecta
- Order: Coleoptera
- Suborder: Polyphaga
- Infraorder: Scarabaeiformia
- Family: Scarabaeidae
- Genus: Perrindema
- Species: P. lindiensis

Binomial name
- Perrindema lindiensis (Moser, 1919)

Synonyms
- Cephaloncheres lindiensis Moser, 1919

Species of beetle

Perrindema lindiensis is a species of beetle of the family Scarabaeidae. It is found in Tanzania.

== Description ==
Adults reach a length of about 18–21 mm (0.71–0.83 in). They have an elongated, chestnut brown body, with the elytra turning black in some specimens.
