= Clitopa zambesina =

Scientific classification
- Kingdom: Animalia
- Phylum: Arthropoda
- Class: Insecta
- Order: Coleoptera
- Suborder: Polyphaga
- Infraorder: Scarabaeiformia
- Family: Scarabaeidae
- Genus: Clitopa
- Species: C. zambesina

Binomial name
- Clitopa zambesina Péringuey, 1904

Species of beetle

Clitopa zambesina is a species of beetle of the family Scarabaeidae. It is found in Zimbabwe.

== Description ==
Adults reach a length of about 18 mm (0.71 in). They are similar to Clitopa bohemani, but larger and with a more depressed appearance on the upper side. The clypeus and head are clothed with similar hairs, but the clypeus is very plainly sinuate in front, the pronotum is also sloping but the pubescence is more fulvous. The chestnut-brown elytra are much more closely punctate, and are therefore more coriaceous and the appressed hairs more numerous, they are plainly broader at the base than across the posterior declivous part, the discoidal depression is very distinct, and they are not costulate on both sides and the juxta-sutural stria is obliterated past the median part. The pygidial part and underside are as in C. bohemani, but even more densely hairy.
