= Achelyna =

Scientific classification
- Kingdom: Animalia
- Phylum: Arthropoda
- Class: Insecta
- Order: Coleoptera
- Suborder: Polyphaga
- Infraorder: Scarabaeiformia
- Family: Scarabaeidae
- Subfamily: Melolonthinae
- Tribe: Tanyproctini
- Genus: Achelyna; Erichson, 1848

Genus of leaf beetles

Achelyna is a genus of beetles belonging to the family Scarabaeidae.

== Species ==
- Achelyna clypeata Burmeister, 1855
- Achelyna testacea Péringuey, 1904
