= Pseustophylla pretoriana =

Scientific classification
- Kingdom: Animalia
- Phylum: Arthropoda
- Class: Insecta
- Order: Coleoptera
- Suborder: Polyphaga
- Infraorder: Scarabaeiformia
- Family: Scarabaeidae
- Genus: Pseustophylla
- Species: P. pretoriana

Binomial name
- Pseustophylla pretoriana Péringuey, 1904

Species of beetle

Pseustophylla pretoriana is a species of beetle of the family Scarabaeidae. It is found in South Africa (Eastern Cape).

== Description ==
Adults reach a length of about 9.5 mm (0.37 in). They are testaceous, with the frontal part fuscous and the pronotum testaceous-red. The clypeus is sparsely pubescent and the head is glabrous except for the base which has a broad fringe of short, appressed yellow hairs. The pronotum is sparingly ciliate laterally and along the base, glabrous on the upper side and covered with deep, round punctures separated by an interval narrower than their diameter, and having a plain median longitudinal impressed line. The scutellum is punctulate and nearly glabrous except the basal part. The elytra are glabrous, but with an outer marginal fringe of yellowish cilia. They are covered with closely set, equi-distant round punctures, and have no costule or stria, not even a juxta-sutural one. The pygidium is sparingly punctate and fringed with somewhat long hairs.
