= Cyclomera =

Scientific classification
- Kingdom: Animalia
- Phylum: Arthropoda
- Class: Insecta
- Order: Coleoptera
- Suborder: Polyphaga
- Infraorder: Scarabaeiformia
- Family: Scarabaeidae
- Subfamily: Melolonthinae
- Tribe: Tanyproctini
- Genus: Cyclomera; Klug, 1855

Genus of leaf beetles

Cyclomera is a genus of beetles belonging to the family Scarabaeidae.

== Species ==
- Cyclomera dispar Klug, 1855
- Cyclomera natalensis (Boheman, 1857)
