= Pseustophylla =

Scientific classification
- Kingdom: Animalia
- Phylum: Arthropoda
- Class: Insecta
- Order: Coleoptera
- Suborder: Polyphaga
- Infraorder: Scarabaeiformia
- Family: Scarabaeidae
- Subfamily: Melolonthinae
- Tribe: Tanyproctini
- Genus: Pseustophylla; Péringuey, 1904

Synonyms
- Ramoutsa Péringuey, 1908

Genus of leaf beetles

Pseustophylla is a genus of beetles belonging to the family Scarabaeidae.

== Species ==
- Pseustophylla fervida (Boheman, 1857)
- Pseustophylla pretoriana Péringuey, 1904
