= Oedanomerus =

Scientific classification
- Kingdom: Animalia
- Phylum: Arthropoda
- Clade: Pancrustacea
- Class: Insecta
- Order: Coleoptera
- Suborder: Polyphaga
- Infraorder: Scarabaeiformia
- Family: Scarabaeidae
- Subfamily: Melolonthinae
- Tribe: Tanyproctini
- Genus: Oedanomerus; Waterhouse, 1875

Genus of leaf beetles

Oedanomerus is a genus of beetles belonging to the family Scarabaeidae.

== Species ==
- Oedanomerus bicolor Evans, 1987
- Oedanomerus bidentatus Sehnal, 2018
- Oedanomerus capriviensis Evans, 1987
- Oedanomerus hirsutus Waterhouse, 1875
- Oedanomerus longicornis Arrow, 1936
- Oedanomerus lupanus Sehnal, 2018
- Oedanomerus pilosus Frey, 1960
- Oedanomerus snizeki Lacroix, 2005
- Oedanomerus squamosus Lacroix, 2005
- Oedanomerus uhligi Lacroix, 2005
