= Neoclitopa murphyi =

Scientific classification
- Kingdom: Animalia
- Phylum: Arthropoda
- Clade: Pancrustacea
- Class: Insecta
- Order: Coleoptera
- Suborder: Polyphaga
- Infraorder: Scarabaeiformia
- Family: Scarabaeidae
- Genus: Neoclitopa
- Species: N. murphyi

Binomial name
- Neoclitopa murphyi Lacroix & Montreuil, 2019

Species of beetle

Neoclitopa murphyi is a species of beetle of the family Scarabaeidae. It is found in Malawi.

== Description ==
Adults reach a length of about 16–17 mm (0.63–0.67 in). They have an elongated body. The forebody is dark brown and densely hairy, while the elytra are more reddish brown and the legs are dark brown.

== Etymology ==
The species is named after its collector, the amateur entomologist Raymond James Murphy.
