= Tanyproctus arher =

Scientific classification
- Kingdom: Animalia
- Phylum: Arthropoda
- Class: Insecta
- Order: Coleoptera
- Suborder: Polyphaga
- Infraorder: Scarabaeiformia
- Family: Scarabaeidae
- Genus: Tanyproctus
- Species: T. arher

Binomial name
- Tanyproctus arher Bezděk, Sehnal & Král, 2013

Species of beetle

Tanyproctus arher is a species of beetle of the family Scarabaeidae. It is found in Yemen (Socotra).

== Description ==
Adults reach a length of about 8.4 mm. They have a shiny, elongate body. The surface is dark brown to black, with the appendages and sutural elytral interval somewhat lighter.

== Etymology ==
The species name refers to the area of origin of the species, the Arher freshwater spring, Socotra (Yemen).
