= Pseudachloa =

Scientific classification
- Kingdom: Animalia
- Phylum: Arthropoda
- Class: Insecta
- Order: Coleoptera
- Suborder: Polyphaga
- Infraorder: Scarabaeiformia
- Family: Scarabaeidae
- Subfamily: Melolonthinae
- Tribe: Tanyproctini
- Genus: Pseudachloa; Péringuey, 1904

Genus of leaf beetles

Pseudachloa is a genus of beetles belonging to the family Scarabaeidae.

== Species ==
- Pseudachloa leonina Péringuey, 1904
- Pseudachloa werneri Lacroix, 2003
