= Aliaclitopa =

Scientific classification
- Kingdom: Animalia
- Phylum: Arthropoda
- Class: Insecta
- Order: Coleoptera
- Suborder: Polyphaga
- Infraorder: Scarabaeiformia
- Family: Scarabaeidae
- Subfamily: Melolonthinae
- Tribe: Tanyproctini
- Genus: Aliaclitopa; Lacroix, 2003

Genus of leaf beetles

Aliaclitopa is a genus of beetles belonging to the family Scarabaeidae.

== Species ==
- Aliaclitopa praecalva (Péringuey, 1904)
- Aliaclitopa snizeki Lacroix, 2003
