= Aegostheta simplex =

Scientific classification
- Kingdom: Animalia
- Phylum: Arthropoda
- Class: Insecta
- Order: Coleoptera
- Suborder: Polyphaga
- Infraorder: Scarabaeiformia
- Family: Scarabaeidae
- Genus: Aegostheta
- Species: A. simplex

Binomial name
- Aegostheta simplex Péringuey, 1904

Species of beetle

Aegostheta simplex is a species of beetle of the family Scarabaeidae. It is found in South Africa (Northern Cape).

== Description ==
Adults reach a length of about 19 mm (0.75 in). They are brick-red, shining and glabrous on the upper side, but with the vertical anterior part of the clypeus, the labrum, and the outer margin of the pronotum hairy, the basal part and also the outer margins of the elytra are thickly and densely pubescent. The pubescence is fulvous. The club of the antennae is chestnut-brown. The whole head has somewhat scattered, round punctures. The pronotum is covered with equi-distant, not closely set, round punctures and the elytra are covered with deep, round, equi-distant punctures separated by an interval broader than their diameter. The propygidium is very briefly pubescent and the pygidium is sparsely punctulate but smooth in the median part, not pubescent. The abdomen is sparsely punctulate even on the sides and the legs are very slightly punctate.
