= Paraclitopa fuscipennis =

Scientific classification
- Kingdom: Animalia
- Phylum: Arthropoda
- Clade: Pancrustacea
- Class: Insecta
- Order: Coleoptera
- Suborder: Polyphaga
- Infraorder: Scarabaeiformia
- Family: Scarabaeidae
- Genus: Paraclitopa
- Species: P. fuscipennis

Binomial name
- Paraclitopa fuscipennis Moser, 1919

Species of beetle

Paraclitopa fuscipennis is a species of beetle of the family Scarabaeidae. It is found in Namibia.

== Description ==
Adults reach a length of about 14–15 mm. They are reddish-yellow, with the head, elytra and pygidium brown. The clypeus has coarse bristled punctures. The pronotum is more than twice as wide as it is long, its lateral margins are strongly curved, its surface is densely and somewhat granularly punctate and covered with long, yellowish-grey hairs. The posterior margin of the pronotum bears long and dense pubescence, completely obscuring the scutellum. The elytra are punctate, with the punctures being coarse and widely spaced. There are short grey hairs on the punctures. Each elytron shows four indistinct ribs. The pygidium is finely leathery-sculpted and weakly wrinkled. The thorax bears long and dense yellowish setae. The abdomen has scattered hairy spots on the sides.
