= Acylochilus =

Scientific classification
- Kingdom: Animalia
- Phylum: Arthropoda
- Class: Insecta
- Order: Coleoptera
- Suborder: Polyphaga
- Infraorder: Scarabaeiformia
- Family: Scarabaeidae
- Subfamily: Melolonthinae
- Tribe: Tanyproctini
- Genus: Acylochilus; Ohaus, 1909

Synonyms
- Acylochilus (Acylochoides) Martinez, 1975

Genus of leaf beetles

Acylochilus is a genus of beetles belonging to the family Scarabaeidae.

== Species ==
- Acylochilus assimilis Ohaus, 1910
- Acylochilus curvidens Ohaus, 1910
- Acylochilus ottianus Ohaus, 1909
- Acylochilus persimilis Martinez, 1959
- Acylochilus strumosus Ohaus, 1909
