= Aegostheta nigricollis =

Scientific classification
- Kingdom: Animalia
- Phylum: Arthropoda
- Class: Insecta
- Order: Coleoptera
- Suborder: Polyphaga
- Infraorder: Scarabaeiformia
- Family: Scarabaeidae
- Genus: Aegostheta
- Species: A. nigricollis

Binomial name
- Aegostheta nigricollis (Péringuey, 1904)

Synonyms
- Macrophylla nigricollis Péringuey, 1904

Species of beetle

Aegostheta nigricollis is a species of beetle of the family Scarabaeidae. It is found in South Africa (Western Cape).

== Description ==
Adults reach a length of about 16–17 mm (0.63–0.67 in). They are black, with the elytra reddish-brown or chestnut-red. They are glabrous on the upper side, except along the base of the pronotum and the outer margins of the elytra. The clypeus is deeply and very closely punctured, the punctures slightly more closely set than on the vertex. The pronotum is impressed longitudinally on the front part of the disk, moderately sloping in the anterior part, the punctures somewhat fine and separated by an interval equal to their own diameter. The scutellum is punctate and the elytra are coriaceous, the punctures deep, somewhat broad, the two costules on either side distinct. The pygidium is pubescent like the abdominal segments.
