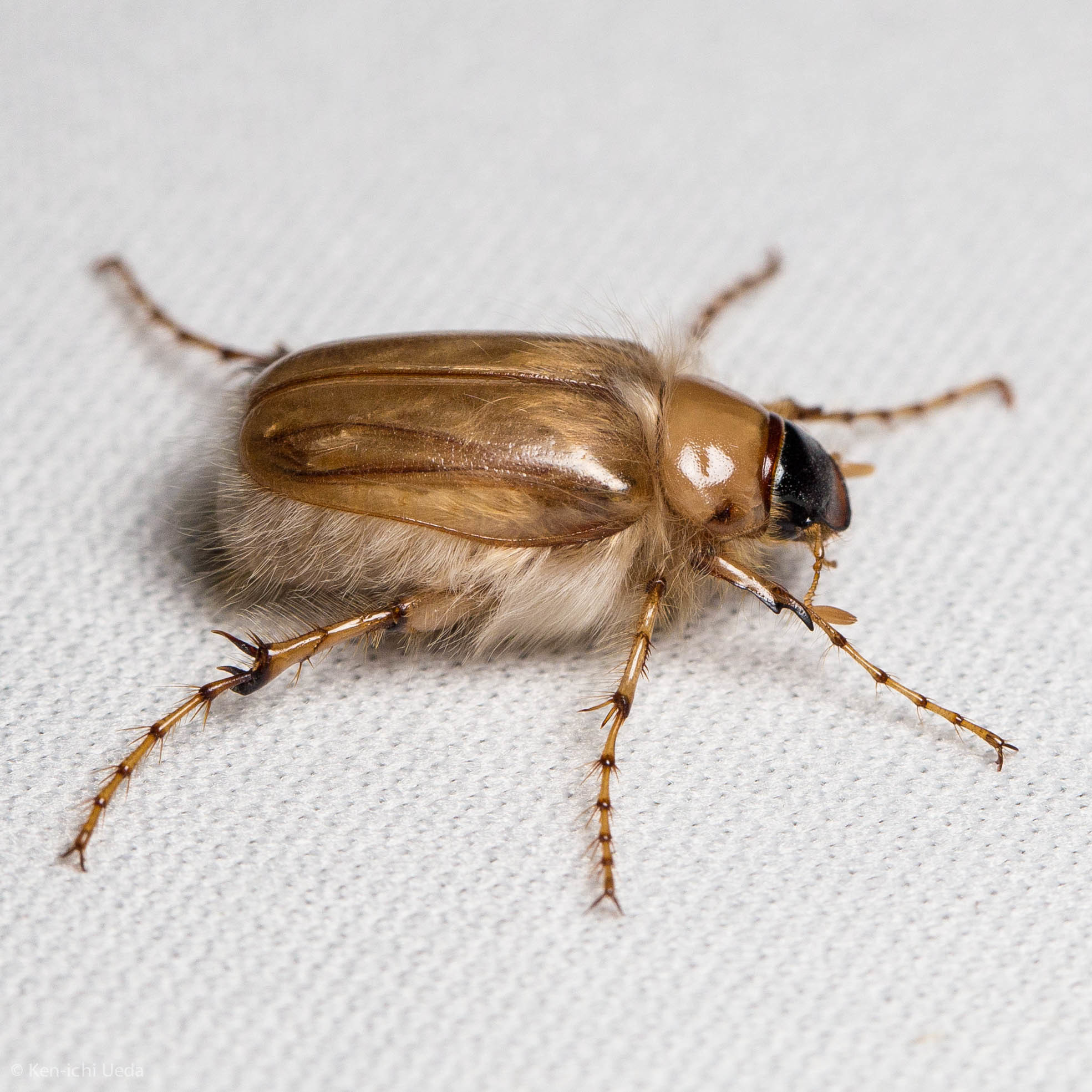

Scientific classification
- Kingdom: Animalia
- Phylum: Arthropoda
- Class: Insecta
- Order: Coleoptera
- Suborder: Polyphaga
- Infraorder: Scarabaeiformia
- Family: Scarabaeidae
- Genus: Phobetus
- Species: P. mojavus

Binomial name
- Phobetus mojavus Barrett, 1933

= Phobetus mojavus =

Species of beetle

Phobetus mojavus is a species of scarab beetle in the family Scarabaeidae. It is found in North America.
