= Kraseophylla =

Scientific classification
- Kingdom: Animalia
- Phylum: Arthropoda
- Clade: Pancrustacea
- Class: Insecta
- Order: Coleoptera
- Suborder: Polyphaga
- Infraorder: Scarabaeiformia
- Family: Scarabaeidae
- Subfamily: Melolonthinae
- Tribe: Tanyproctini
- Genus: Kraseophylla; Péringuey, 1904
- Species: K. distincta

Binomial name
- Kraseophylla distincta Péringuey, 1904

Genus of beetles

Kraseophylla is a genus of beetle of the family Scarabaeidae. It is monotypic, being represented by the single species, Kraseophylla distincta, which is found in South Africa (Eastern Cape).

== Description ==
Adults reach a length of about 15 mm (0.59 in). They are fuscous, with the antennal club and the elytra chestnut-brown. The head, especially the frontal part and the vertex, has erect, fulvous hairs and the pronotum and pectus are clothed with a very dense, long pubescence. Each puncture on the elytra bears a minute hair, and those on the abdominal segment a short, appressed, somewhat squamiform one. The clypeus is truncate in front with the outer angles slightly rounded and the margin somewhat raised, as long as the frontal part and divided from it by a plain suture, both parts are covered with deep, nearly contiguous, somewhat rough punctures. The pronotum is very closely and somewhat deeply punctured, but the sculpture is hidden by the long pubescence. The scutellum is foveolato-punctate and hairy and the elytra have three costules on each side and a juxta-sutural stria, the two discoidal costules are distinct, but the other two are very weak, and the whole surface is irregularly punctate and somewhat coriaceous. The punctures on the pygidium and abdominal segments are very closely set.
