= Falsotoclinius schauffelei =

Scientific classification
- Kingdom: Animalia
- Phylum: Arthropoda
- Class: Insecta
- Order: Coleoptera
- Suborder: Polyphaga
- Infraorder: Scarabaeiformia
- Family: Scarabaeidae
- Genus: Falsotoclinius
- Species: F. schauffelei

Binomial name
- Falsotoclinius schauffelei (Petrovitz, 1958)

Synonyms
- Otoclinius schauffelei Petrovitz, 1958

Species of beetle

Falsotoclinius schauffelei is a species of beetle of the family Scarabaeidae. It is found in south-western Iran.

== Description ==
Adults reach a length of about 7–8.5 mm. They have a light yellowish-brown, short oval body. The clypeus is cup-shaped, with the center smooth, shiny, and unpunctate. The anterior margin of the pronotum is ciliate.
