= Paraclitopa lanuginosa =

Scientific classification
- Kingdom: Animalia
- Phylum: Arthropoda
- Class: Insecta
- Order: Coleoptera
- Suborder: Polyphaga
- Infraorder: Scarabaeiformia
- Family: Scarabaeidae
- Genus: Paraclitopa
- Species: P. lanuginosa

Binomial name
- Paraclitopa lanuginosa Waterhouse, 1875

Species of beetle

Paraclitopa lanuginosa is a species of beetle of the family Scarabaeidae. It is found in Botswana.

== Description ==
Adults reach a length of about 12.7 mm (0.50 in). They are fusco-griseous and pubescent, with the head piceous black, the body testaceous underneath and the antennae flavous. The head is closely punctulate and the pronotum is finely and closely punctulate and clothed with long testaceous hairs. The elytra are covered with closely set punctures and are briefly pubescent. The pectus is clothed with long testaceous hairs.
