= Periclitopa =

Scientific classification
- Kingdom: Animalia
- Phylum: Arthropoda
- Class: Insecta
- Order: Coleoptera
- Suborder: Polyphaga
- Infraorder: Scarabaeiformia
- Family: Scarabaeidae
- Subfamily: Melolonthinae
- Tribe: Tanyproctini
- Genus: Periclitopa; Brenske, 1896

Genus of leaf beetles

Periclitopa is a genus of beetles belonging to the family Scarabaeidae.

== Species ==
- Periclitopa brenskei Brancsik, 1897
- Periclitopa dubiosula Péringuey, 1904
- Periclitopa fischeri Brenske, 1896
- Periclitopa gariepina Péringuey, 1904
- Periclitopa sambesiana (Nonfried, 1906)
- Periclitopa varicornis Péringuey, 1904
