= Aliaclitopa praecalva =

Scientific classification
- Kingdom: Animalia
- Phylum: Arthropoda
- Class: Insecta
- Order: Coleoptera
- Suborder: Polyphaga
- Infraorder: Scarabaeiformia
- Family: Scarabaeidae
- Genus: Aliaclitopa
- Species: A. praecalva

Binomial name
- Aliaclitopa praecalva (Péringuey, 1904)

Synonyms
- Clitopa praecalva Péringuey, 1904

Species of beetle

Aliaclitopa praecalva is a species of beetle of the family Scarabaeidae. It is found in Zimbabwe.

== Description ==
Adults reach a length of about 12–13 mm (0.47–0.51 in) (males) and about 10.5 mm (0.41 in) (females). Males are chestnut-brown, with the median part of the pronotum fuscous-brown, the palpi and pedicel of the antennae light chestnut (and the club darker than the pedicel). The posterior part of the head, pronotum, scutellum, pygidium and underside are clothed with a very long pubescence, which is greyish-white underneath, but has a slight flavescent tinge on the upper side. The elytra each have five longitudinal stripes of appressed greyish-white hairs. Females are reddish-brown and shiny, with the frons and clypeus deeply pitted, the punctures almost foveate on the semicircular clypeus, the margin of which is much raised and has an inner row of fairly long, upright, sub-fulvous hairs. The pronotum is fringed on the sides with very long, fine hairs, very sparingly punctate even on the sides, where each puncture bears a long setose hair, and having a fringe of shorter ones in the median part of the base above the scutellum. The elytra are shiny, irregularly sub-punctulate in the anterior part, coriaceous behind, and have extremely faint traces of two dorsal striae, and are fringed laterally and behind with very long hairs, but are otherwise glabrous.
