= Neoclitopa =

Scientific classification
- Kingdom: Animalia
- Phylum: Arthropoda
- Class: Insecta
- Order: Coleoptera
- Suborder: Polyphaga
- Infraorder: Scarabaeiformia
- Family: Scarabaeidae
- Subfamily: Melolonthinae
- Tribe: Tanyproctini
- Genus: Neoclitopa; Lacroix, 1997

Genus of leaf beetles

Neoclitopa is a genus of beetles belonging to the family Scarabaeidae.

== Species ==
- Neoclitopa murphyi Lacroix & Montreuil, 2019
- Neoclitopa nitidipennis (Arrow, 1902)
- Neoclitopa robichei Lacroix & Montreuil, 2016
