= Clitopa =

Scientific classification
- Kingdom: Animalia
- Phylum: Arthropoda
- Class: Insecta
- Order: Coleoptera
- Suborder: Polyphaga
- Infraorder: Scarabaeiformia
- Family: Scarabaeidae
- Subfamily: Melolonthinae
- Tribe: Tanyproctini
- Genus: Clitopa; Erichson, 1847

Genus of leaf beetles

Clitopa is a genus of beetles belonging to the family Scarabaeidae.

== Species ==
- Clitopa bechuanensis (Moser, 1919)
- Clitopa bohemani Blanchard, 1851
- Clitopa capra Arrow, 1902
- Clitopa debilis Péringuey, 1908
- Clitopa rojkoffi Lacroix & Montreuil, 2019
- Clitopa rufiventris (Boheman, 1857)
- Clitopa zambesina Péringuey, 1904
