= Plesiopalacephala =

Scientific classification
- Kingdom: Animalia
- Phylum: Arthropoda
- Class: Insecta
- Order: Coleoptera
- Suborder: Polyphaga
- Infraorder: Scarabaeiformia
- Family: Scarabaeidae
- Subfamily: Melolonthinae
- Tribe: Tanyproctini
- Genus: Plesiopalacephala; Lacroix, 2006

Genus of leaf beetles

Plesiopalacephala is a genus of beetles belonging to the family Scarabaeidae.

== Species ==
- Plesiopalacephala castanea (Klug, 1855)
- Plesiopalacephala delgadoensis Lacroix & Montreuil, 2015
