= Aegostheta ciliata =

Scientific classification
- Kingdom: Animalia
- Phylum: Arthropoda
- Class: Insecta
- Order: Coleoptera
- Suborder: Polyphaga
- Infraorder: Scarabaeiformia
- Family: Scarabaeidae
- Genus: Aegostheta
- Species: A. ciliata

Binomial name
- Aegostheta ciliata (Herbst, 1790)

Synonyms
- Melolontha ciliata Herbst, 1790; Rhizotrogus maritimus Laporte, 1840

Species of beetle

Aegostheta ciliata is a species of beetle of the family Scarabaeidae. It is found in South Africa (Western Cape, Eastern Cape).

== Description ==
Adults reach a length of about 21–22 mm (0.83–0.87 in). The head and pronotum are black, while the elytra and underside are light chestnut brown and the legs are reddish-brown. The head (except the clypeus) and the pronotum are clothed with a dense, long, appressed, fulvous pubescence, the elytra have a very closely-set but very short pubescence of the same colour altogether obscuring the background, and the pygidial part and abdominal segments are clothed with greyish appressed hairs much less closely set than on the elytra. The pectus is hidden by a fulvous very dense villosity.
