= Plesiopalacephala castanea =

Scientific classification
- Kingdom: Animalia
- Phylum: Arthropoda
- Class: Insecta
- Order: Coleoptera
- Suborder: Polyphaga
- Infraorder: Scarabaeiformia
- Family: Scarabaeidae
- Genus: Plesiopalacephala
- Species: P. castanea

Binomial name
- Plesiopalacephala castanea (Klug, 1855)

Synonyms
- Cyclomera castanea Klug, 1855

Species of beetle

Plesiopalacephala castanea is a species of beetle of the family Scarabaeidae. It is found in Mozambique.

== Description ==
Adults reach a length of about 18 mm (0.71 in). They are brownish-black, not without metallic lustre, and covered with long, reddish-yellow hairs as far as this colour extends, the elytra only are differently coloured, being brown, but instead of being densely hairy they have a few scattered hairs. The head is truncate in front, free of hairs up to the vertex, the clypeus is reflexed at the margin and coarsely punctate, separated from the frontal part by an impressed line, the posterior edge of the latter is swollen and raised, and the vertex is covered with longer, reddish-yellow hairs. The antennae are brown, except for the black club. The pronotum is densely and finely scaly, the scutellum punctate and the elytra punctate, with a rugose border. The middle legs are reddish-brown, with rusty-brown hairs.
