= Aegostheta pubens =

Scientific classification
- Kingdom: Animalia
- Phylum: Arthropoda
- Class: Insecta
- Order: Coleoptera
- Suborder: Polyphaga
- Infraorder: Scarabaeiformia
- Family: Scarabaeidae
- Genus: Aegostheta
- Species: A. pubens

Binomial name
- Aegostheta pubens (Péringuey, 1904)

Synonyms
- Macrophylla pubens Péringuey, 1904

Species of beetle

Aegostheta pubens is a species of beetle of the family Scarabaeidae. It is found in South Africa (Eastern Cape).

== Description ==
Adults reach a length of about 27 mm (1.1 in). They are fuscous, with the elytra and antennae chestnut-brown. The head and pronotum are clothed with a dense, short, appressed, light fulvous pubescence, and the elytra is also clothed, but with a very short, dense pubescence. Both the head and clypeus are covered with fine, very closely set punctures. The pronotum is covered, like the head, with very fine and closely set punctures and the scutellum is very finely punctured and densely pubescent. The elytra are very finely punctured and have on each side three or four somewhat plain striae in addition to the juxta-sutural one.
