= Neoclitopa robichei =

Scientific classification
- Kingdom: Animalia
- Phylum: Arthropoda
- Clade: Pancrustacea
- Class: Insecta
- Order: Coleoptera
- Suborder: Polyphaga
- Infraorder: Scarabaeiformia
- Family: Scarabaeidae
- Genus: Neoclitopa
- Species: N. robichei

Binomial name
- Neoclitopa robichei Lacroix & Montreuil, 2016

Species of beetle

Neoclitopa robichei is a species of beetle of the family Scarabaeidae. It is found in Mozambique.

== Description ==
Adults reach a length of about 17–18 mm (0.67–0.71 in). They have a rather massive, broadened body. The head, pronotum and scutellum are blackish, while the elytra are chestnut brown, edged in black on the sides.

== Etymology ==
The species is named after Gérard Robiche, a specialist of African Tenebrionidae.
