= Eucyclophylla =

Scientific classification
- Kingdom: Animalia
- Phylum: Arthropoda
- Class: Insecta
- Order: Coleoptera
- Suborder: Polyphaga
- Infraorder: Scarabaeiformia
- Family: Scarabaeidae
- Subfamily: Melolonthinae
- Tribe: Tanyproctini
- Genus: Eucyclophylla; Waterhouse, 1875

Genus of leaf beetles

Eucyclophylla is a genus of beetles belonging to the family Scarabaeidae.

== Species ==
- Eucyclophylla flavida Lacroix, 2005
- Eucyclophylla lata Waterhouse, 1875
- Eucyclophylla leggi Lacroix, 2005
- Eucyclophylla namaqua Evans, 1987
