= Tanyproctus puncticeps =

Scientific classification
- Kingdom: Animalia
- Phylum: Arthropoda
- Class: Insecta
- Order: Coleoptera
- Suborder: Polyphaga
- Infraorder: Scarabaeiformia
- Family: Scarabaeidae
- Genus: Tanyproctus
- Species: T. puncticeps

Binomial name
- Tanyproctus puncticeps (Waterhouse, 1881)

Synonyms
- Pachydema puncticeps Waterhouse, 1881

Species of beetle

Tanyproctus puncticeps is a species of beetle of the family Scarabaeidae. It is found in Yemen (Socotra).

== Description ==
Adults reach a length of about 22 mm. They have an elongate, light brownish body, while the head is blackish. The dorsal surface is moderately shiny.
