= Palacephala erichsoni =

Scientific classification
- Kingdom: Animalia
- Phylum: Arthropoda
- Class: Insecta
- Order: Coleoptera
- Suborder: Polyphaga
- Infraorder: Scarabaeiformia
- Family: Scarabaeidae
- Genus: Palacephala
- Species: P. erichsoni

Binomial name
- Palacephala erichsoni (Klug, 1855)

Synonyms
- Clitopa erichsoni Klug, 1855; Periclitopa erichsoni

Species of beetle

Palacephala erichsoni is a species of beetle of the family Scarabaeidae. It is found in Mozambique.

== Description ==
Adults reach a length of about 15 mm (0.59 in). The upper side is dark brown, and with the exception of the clypeus densely punctured, the frontal part is excavated, sharply edged in front by a straight, prominent transverse keel and divided from the vertex by a lower keel. The clypeus is smooth, projecting in an inclined direction, with the margin reflexed. The antennae are reddish and the head and pronotum are wrinkled, densely grey-haired, more lightly rugose and hairy on the elytra, which are of a redder colour. The sternum and legs are dark brown like the head and pronotum and similarly hairy. The abdomen brownish-yellow, lightly rugose and hairy.
