= Tanyproctus waziristanicus =

Scientific classification
- Kingdom: Animalia
- Phylum: Arthropoda
- Clade: Pancrustacea
- Class: Insecta
- Order: Coleoptera
- Suborder: Polyphaga
- Infraorder: Scarabaeiformia
- Family: Scarabaeidae
- Genus: Tanyproctus
- Species: T. waziristanicus

Binomial name
- Tanyproctus waziristanicus Keith, 2009

Species of beetle

Tanyproctus waziristanicus is a species of beetle of the family Scarabaeidae. It is found in Pakistan.

== Description ==
Adults reach a length of about 9 mm. They are entirely bright reddish-brown, with the head and pronotum slightly darker, and the margins of the clypeus and the periocular areas closely edged in black, as are the extreme parts of the protibiae and the apex of the tarsi. The antennae are lighter yellowish-brown.

== Etymology ==
The species name refers to its geographic origin.
