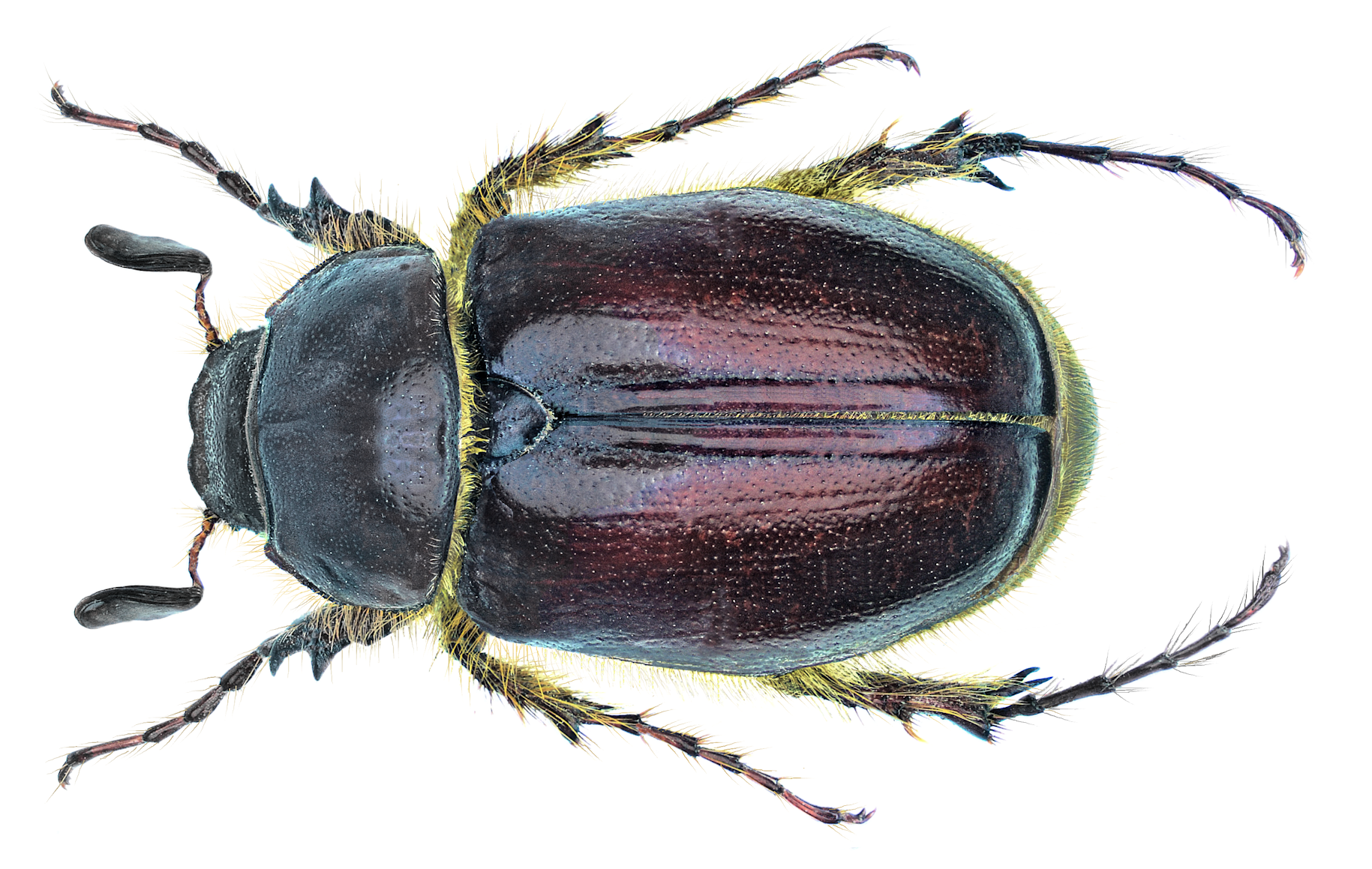
- Tanyproctus ganglbaueri

Scientific classification
- Kingdom: Animalia
- Phylum: Arthropoda
- Clade: Pancrustacea
- Class: Insecta
- Order: Coleoptera
- Suborder: Polyphaga
- Infraorder: Scarabaeiformia
- Family: Scarabaeidae
- Subfamily: Melolonthinae
- Tribe: Tanyproctini
- Genus: Tanyproctus; Ménétriés, 1832

= Tanyproctus =

Genus of leaf beetles

Tanyproctus is a genus of beetles belonging to the family Scarabaeidae. They are found in southeastern Europe, and from the Middle East to East Asia.

== Species ==
Subgenus Brachydema Fairmaire, 1884

- Tanyproctus adanensis Reitter, 1908
- Tanyproctus aphodioides (Fairmaire, 1866)
- Tanyproctus beskindensis Reitter, 1902
- Tanyproctus carceli (Fairmaire, 1884)
- Tanyproctus demaisoni (Reitter, 1902)
- Tanyproctus kraatzi Reitter, 1902
- Tanyproctus lamberti (Fairmaire, 1884)
- Tanyproctus latimanus Reitter, 1902
- Tanyproctus longipes (Burmeister, 1855)
- Tanyproctus novicius Reitter, 1902
- Tanyproctus pilimargo Reitter, 1902
- Tanyproctus pygidialis Reitter, 1902
- Tanyproctus riparius Petrovitz, 1963
- Tanyproctus rugosulus Fairmaire, 1892
- Tanyproctus sinuatifrons (Fairmaire, 1881)
- Tanyproctus unicolor Motschulsky, 1859
- Tanyproctus verryi (Fairmaire, 1884)
- Tanyproctus yunnanicus Keith, 2007

Subgenus Tanyproctocera Reitter, 1902

- Tanyproctus crinitus Petrovitz, 1971
- Tanyproctus delesserti (Reiche & Saulcy, 1856)
- Tanyproctus festivus (Burmeister, 1855)
- Tanyproctus israeliticus Petrovitz, 1971
- Tanyproctus kriecheldorffi Reitter, 1909
- Tanyproctus lanatus (Chevrolat, 1873)
- Tanyproctus ledereri (Reiche, 1861)
- Tanyproctus minutus Petrovitz, 1973
- Tanyproctus nabataeus Petrovitz, 1973
- Tanyproctus portusus Reitter, 1902
- Tanyproctus pumilus Petrovitz, 1973
- Tanyproctus saulcyi (Reiche & Saulcy, 1856)
- Tanyproctus sinaiticus (Heyden, 1899)
- Tanyproctus syriacus Medvedev, 1952

Subgenus Tanyproctus Ménétriés, 1832

- Tanyproctus araxidis Reitter, 1902
- Tanyproctus arher Bezděk, Sehnal & Král, 2013
- Tanyproctus armeniacus Medvedev, 1952
- Tanyproctus batangicus Keith, 2009
- Tanyproctus beludschistanus Petrovitz, 1968
- Tanyproctus bicuspidatus (Peyerimhoff, 1926)
- Tanyproctus bucharicus (Reitter, 1897)
- Tanyproctus canui Lacroix, 1999
- Tanyproctus carbonarius Faldermann, 1836
- Tanyproctus cariensis Petrovitz, 1971
- Tanyproctus confinis Motschulsky, 1859
- Tanyproctus davidis Fairmaire, 1886
- Tanyproctus dechambrei Lacroix, 1996
- Tanyproctus eghtedari Petrovitz, 1980
- Tanyproctus eversmanni Reitter, 1902
- Tanyproctus farsensis Keith, 2009
- Tanyproctus fastus Petrovitz, 1968
- Tanyproctus feai Lacroix, 1997
- Tanyproctus francottei Keith & Lacroix, 1999
- Tanyproctus ganglbaueri (Brenske, 1897)
- Tanyproctus gouverneuri Keith, 2012
- Tanyproctus holzschuhi Petrovitz, 1973
- Tanyproctus indescriptus Baraud, 1979
- Tanyproctus inflatus Motschulsky, 1859
- Tanyproctus iranicus Petrovitz, 1968
- Tanyproctus jizu Král, 1999
- Tanyproctus jordaniacus Baraud, 1990
- Tanyproctus kabulensis Petrovitz, 1967
- Tanyproctus karenensis Keith, 2007
- Tanyproctus keithi Král, Sehnal & Bezděk, 2012
- Tanyproctus kermanshahensis Petrovitz, 1980
- Tanyproctus kindermanni (Reiche, 1861)
- Tanyproctus kurdistanus Reitter, 1902
- Tanyproctus lacroixi Král, Sehnal & Bezděk, 2012
- Tanyproctus lydiensis Petrovitz, 1971
- Tanyproctus mourzinei Keith] & Lacroix, 1999
- Tanyproctus muchei Petrovitz, 1962
- Tanyproctus nitidus Petrovitz, 1968
- Tanyproctus opacipennis Petrovitz, 1968
- Tanyproctus ortospanaensis Petrovitz, 1965
- Tanyproctus ovatus Motschulsky, 1859
- Tanyproctus pallidus Petrovitz, 1962
- Tanyproctus pamphilus Petrovitz, 1967
- Tanyproctus parallelus Petrovitz, 1968
- Tanyproctus parvus Zhang & Luo, 1981
- Tanyproctus paulusi Petrovitz, 1980
- Tanyproctus persicola Reitter, 1909
- Tanyproctus persicus Ménétriés, 1832
- Tanyproctus poggii Keith, 2009
- Tanyproctus puncticeps (Waterhouse, 1881)
- Tanyproctus reichei (Rambur, 1843)
- Tanyproctus rubicundus Reitter, 1902
- Tanyproctus rufidens (Marseul, 1879)
- Tanyproctus sabatinellii Keith, 2009
- Tanyproctus samai Piattella & Sabatinelli, 1996
- Tanyproctus sanxiaensis Zhang & Li, 1997
- Tanyproctus satanas Reitter, 1902
- Tanyproctus sichuanicus Keith, 2007
- Tanyproctus similis Petrovitz, 1962
- Tanyproctus speculator Petrovitz, 1963
- Tanyproctus tenasserimensis Keith, 2007
- Tanyproctus tuniseus Baraud, 1979
- Tanyproctus turanicus Reitter, 1900
- Tanyproctus varians Petrovitz, 1980
- Tanyproctus vedicus Kalashian, 1999
- Tanyproctus waziristanicus Keith, 2009
- Tanyproctus wraniki Král, Sehnal & Bezděk, 2012
- Tanyproctus xizangensis Zhang, 1987
- Tanyproctus yunnanus Keith & Lacroix, 2003
- Tanyproctus zartoshti Petrovitz, 1980
- Tanyproctus zuzanae Král, 2020
