= Tanyproctus beludschistanus =

Scientific classification
- Kingdom: Animalia
- Phylum: Arthropoda
- Class: Insecta
- Order: Coleoptera
- Suborder: Polyphaga
- Infraorder: Scarabaeiformia
- Family: Scarabaeidae
- Genus: Tanyproctus
- Species: T. beludschistanus

Binomial name
- Tanyproctus beludschistanus Petrovitz, 1968

Species of beetle

Tanyproctus beludschistanus is a species of beetle of the family Scarabaeidae. It is found in Iran.

== Description ==
Adults reach a length of about 10.6–11.4 mm. They have a light reddish-brown, narrowly ovate, shiny body, with the elytra somewhat duller. The antennae are brownish-yellow. The sides of the pronotum, and those of the elytra are bristly hairy.
