= Aegostheta =

Scientific classification
- Kingdom: Animalia
- Phylum: Arthropoda
- Class: Insecta
- Order: Coleoptera
- Suborder: Polyphaga
- Infraorder: Scarabaeiformia
- Family: Scarabaeidae
- Subfamily: Melolonthinae
- Tribe: Tanyproctini
- Genus: Aegostheta; Dejean, 1833

Synonyms
- Pleiophylla Péringuey, 1904; Macrophylla Hope, 1837

Genus of leaf beetles

Aegostheta is a genus of beetles belonging to the family Scarabaeidae.

== Species ==
- Aegostheta boa (Erichson, 1848)
- Aegostheta brachiata Péringuey, 1904
- Aegostheta capicola (Péringuey, 1904)
- Aegostheta ciliata (Herbst, 1790)
- Aegostheta longicornis (Fabricius, 1787)
- Aegostheta maritima (Burmeister, 1855)
- Aegostheta natalensis (Péringuey, 1904)
- Aegostheta nigra (Blanchard, 1851)
- Aegostheta nigricollis (Péringuey, 1904)
- Aegostheta pubens (Péringuey, 1904)
- Aegostheta simplex Péringuey, 1904
- Aegostheta sjoestedti Moser, 1922
- Aegostheta vestita (Péringuey, 1904)
