= Tanyproctus canui =

Scientific classification
- Kingdom: Animalia
- Phylum: Arthropoda
- Class: Insecta
- Order: Coleoptera
- Suborder: Polyphaga
- Infraorder: Scarabaeiformia
- Family: Scarabaeidae
- Genus: Tanyproctus
- Species: T. canui

Binomial name
- Tanyproctus canui Lacroix, 1999

Species of beetle

Tanyproctus canui is a species of beetle of the family Scarabaeidae. It is found in Yemen (Socotra).

== Description ==
Adults reach a length of about 11.8–17.2 mm. They have an elongate, light brownish body, while the head is dark brown to blackish. The dorsal surface is shiny.
