= Scaphorhina hirticollis =

Scientific classification
- Kingdom: Animalia
- Phylum: Arthropoda
- Class: Insecta
- Order: Coleoptera
- Suborder: Polyphaga
- Infraorder: Scarabaeiformia
- Family: Scarabaeidae
- Genus: Scaphorhina
- Species: S. hirticollis

Binomial name
- Scaphorhina hirticollis (Waterhouse, 1875)

Synonyms
- Cyclomera hirticollis Waterhouse, 1875; Aipeiopsis hirticollis

Species of beetle

Scaphorhina hirticollis is a species of beetle of the family Scarabaeidae. It is found in Botswana, Namibia and South Africa (Cape).

== Description ==
They have an elongated, parallel, convex, brownish body, clothed with a flavous pubescence. The frontal part bears on the anterior part a short, shining, transverse lamina. The clypeus is concave, plainly punctulate, with the margins strongly reflexed, and the anterior angles well rounded. The pronotum is clothed with a long flavous pubescence and the elytra are finely punctulate and briefly pubescent and bi-costate on each side. The underside is clothed with long hairs.
