= Canudema =

Scientific classification
- Kingdom: Animalia
- Phylum: Arthropoda
- Class: Insecta
- Order: Coleoptera
- Suborder: Polyphaga
- Infraorder: Scarabaeiformia
- Family: Scarabaeidae
- Tribe: Tanyproctini
- Genus: Canudema; Lacroix, 1994

Genus of beetles

Canudema is a genus of beetles belonging to the family Scarabaeidae. The genus is endemic to Socotra.

== Description ==
Canudema are elongate, medium-sized beetles (length 12–15 mm (0.47–0.59 in)). The coloration is black, with dark brownish extremities and elytra.

== Species ==
There are two recognized species:

- Canudema homhil Král, Sehnal & Bezděk, 2012
- Canudema socotrae Lacroix, 1994
