= Falsotoclinius =

Scientific classification
- Kingdom: Animalia
- Phylum: Arthropoda
- Clade: Pancrustacea
- Class: Insecta
- Order: Coleoptera
- Suborder: Polyphaga
- Infraorder: Scarabaeiformia
- Family: Scarabaeidae
- Subfamily: Melolonthinae
- Tribe: Tanyproctini
- Genus: Falsotoclinius; Keith & Montreuil, 2004

Genus of leaf beetles

Falsotoclinius is a genus of beetles belonging to the family Scarabaeidae.

== Species ==
- Falsotoclinius fragilis (Petrovitz, 1980)
- Falsotoclinius nikodymi Keith, 2007
- Falsotoclinius richteri (Petrovitz, 1958)
- Falsotoclinius schauffelei (Petrovitz, 1958)
- Falsotoclinius sehnali Keith, 2007
