= Palacephala =

Scientific classification
- Kingdom: Animalia
- Phylum: Arthropoda
- Class: Insecta
- Order: Coleoptera
- Suborder: Polyphaga
- Infraorder: Scarabaeiformia
- Family: Scarabaeidae
- Subfamily: Melolonthinae
- Tribe: Tanyproctini
- Genus: Palacephala; Lacroix, 1999

Genus of leaf beetles

Palacephala is a genus of beetles belonging to the family Scarabaeidae.

== Species ==
- Palacephala erichsoni (Klug, 1855)
- Palacephala laeviplagiata (Kolbe, 1897)
