= Periclitopa fischeri =

Scientific classification
- Kingdom: Animalia
- Phylum: Arthropoda
- Class: Insecta
- Order: Coleoptera
- Suborder: Polyphaga
- Infraorder: Scarabaeiformia
- Family: Scarabaeidae
- Genus: Periclitopa
- Species: P. fischeri

Binomial name
- Periclitopa fischeri Brenske, 1896

Species of beetle

Periclitopa fischeri is a species of beetle of the family Scarabaeidae. It is found in South Africa (Mpumalanga, Limpopo).

== Description ==
Adults reach a length of about 19 mm (0.75 in). The head and pronotum are fuscous, while the anterior part of the clypeus, underside, legs and antennae are brownish-red. The elytra are dark chestnut. The clypeus has a very plain suture, transverse and with the outer angles very little rounded, margins strongly reflexed, it is roughly punctured and briefly pubescent, the frontal part is somewhat scrobiculate, very plainly carinate laterally and densely hairy especially on the vertex. The pronotum is clothed with a very dense fulvous pubescence and the scutellum is covered with a pubescence similar to that of the pronotum. The elytra are very coriaceous, and covered with minute flavescent appressed hairs springing from every interstice. The juxta-sutural stria is well defined, and there are two very faint dorsal striae on each side and two supra-lateral costules, the margins, including the sutural ones, have a fringe of densely set, short, fulvous cilia.
