= Tanyproctus keithi =

Scientific classification
- Kingdom: Animalia
- Phylum: Arthropoda
- Class: Insecta
- Order: Coleoptera
- Suborder: Polyphaga
- Infraorder: Scarabaeiformia
- Family: Scarabaeidae
- Genus: Tanyproctus
- Species: T. keithi

Binomial name
- Tanyproctus keithi Král, Sehnal & Bezděk, 2012

Species of beetle

Tanyproctus keithi is a species of beetle of the family Scarabaeidae. It is found in Yemen (Socotra).

== Description ==
Adults reach a length of about 12.2–16.8 mm. They have an elongate, castaneous body, while the head is blackish. The dorsal surface is moderately shiny.

== Etymology ==
The species is named for entomologist Denis Keith.
