= Oedanomerus hirsutus =

Scientific classification
- Kingdom: Animalia
- Phylum: Arthropoda
- Clade: Pancrustacea
- Class: Insecta
- Order: Coleoptera
- Suborder: Polyphaga
- Infraorder: Scarabaeiformia
- Family: Scarabaeidae
- Genus: Oedanomerus
- Species: O. hirsutus

Binomial name
- Oedanomerus hirsutus Waterhouse, 1875

Species of beetle

Oedanomerus hirsutus is a species of beetle of the family Scarabaeidae. It is found in Botswana.

== Description ==
Adults reach a length of about 8–9.5 mm (0.31–0.37 in). They have a cylindrical, chestnut-brown body, covered with white hairs. The head and pronotum are piceous-black, and the vertex, forehead and clypeus each have a shining, transverse sharp keel. The pronotum is covered on each side with asperous punctures and the scutellum is smooth. The elytra are moderately closely punctulate and have on each side two hardly conspicuous costules.
