= Tanyproctus sabatinellii =

Scientific classification
- Kingdom: Animalia
- Phylum: Arthropoda
- Clade: Pancrustacea
- Class: Insecta
- Order: Coleoptera
- Suborder: Polyphaga
- Infraorder: Scarabaeiformia
- Family: Scarabaeidae
- Genus: Tanyproctus
- Species: T. sabatinellii

Binomial name
- Tanyproctus sabatinellii Keith, 2009

Species of beetle

Tanyproctus sabatinellii is a species of beetle of the family Scarabaeidae. It is found in Thailand.

== Description ==
Adults reach a length of about 10.2 mm. They have a glossy, elongated, bicoloured body, with the forebody and scutellum dark brownish-black, while the elytra, and appendages are partially lighter reddish-brown.

== Etymology ==
The species is named for Dr Guido Sabatinelli.
