= Perrindema genieri =

Scientific classification
- Kingdom: Animalia
- Phylum: Arthropoda
- Clade: Pancrustacea
- Class: Insecta
- Order: Coleoptera
- Suborder: Polyphaga
- Infraorder: Scarabaeiformia
- Family: Scarabaeidae
- Genus: Perrindema
- Species: P. genieri

Binomial name
- Perrindema genieri Lacroix & Montreuil, 2017

Species of beetle

Perrindema genieri is a species of beetle of the family Scarabaeidae. It is found in Mozambique.

== Description ==
Adults reach a length of about 16–21 mm (0.63–0.83 in). The forebody and legs are blackish, while the elytra are light chestnut brown, but some specimens are entirely blackish.

== Etymology ==
The species is dedicated to François Génier.
