= Periclitopa gariepina =

Scientific classification
- Kingdom: Animalia
- Phylum: Arthropoda
- Class: Insecta
- Order: Coleoptera
- Suborder: Polyphaga
- Infraorder: Scarabaeiformia
- Family: Scarabaeidae
- Genus: Periclitopa
- Species: P. gariepina

Binomial name
- Periclitopa gariepina Péringuey, 1904

Species of beetle

Periclitopa gariepina is a species of beetle of the family Scarabaeidae. It is found in South Africa (Northern Cape).

== Description ==
Adults reach a length of about 17 mm (0.67 in). They are piceous, with the antennae fulvous, and the long pubescence clothing the pronotum, the scutellum and the pectus is light fulvous. The head and clypeus are closely and roughly punctured, briefly pubescent, but the hairs on the vertex are long. The pronotum is finely shagreened, moderately rounded laterally, but slightly less narrowed towards the posterior than towards the anterior part, and with the basal angle rounded. The elytra are strongly coriaceous and with a minute, appressed greyish hair in each interstice. The pygidial part has appressed, somewhat long hairs and the abdominal segments more deeply punctured than the pygidium, each puncture bearing a somewhat long, fulvous hair.
