= Tanyproctus lacroixi =

Scientific classification
- Kingdom: Animalia
- Phylum: Arthropoda
- Class: Insecta
- Order: Coleoptera
- Suborder: Polyphaga
- Infraorder: Scarabaeiformia
- Family: Scarabaeidae
- Genus: Tanyproctus
- Species: T. lacroixi

Binomial name
- Tanyproctus lacroixi Král, Sehnal & Bezděk, 2012

Species of beetle

Tanyproctus lacroixi is a species of beetle of the family Scarabaeidae. It is found in Yemen (Socotra).

== Description ==
Adults reach a length of about 11.1–16 mm. They have an elongate, light brownish body, while the head is blackish. The dorsal surface is moderately shiny.

== Etymology ==
The species is named for entomologist Marc Lacroix.
