= Perrindema pembaensis =

Scientific classification
- Kingdom: Animalia
- Phylum: Arthropoda
- Clade: Pancrustacea
- Class: Insecta
- Order: Coleoptera
- Suborder: Polyphaga
- Infraorder: Scarabaeiformia
- Family: Scarabaeidae
- Genus: Perrindema
- Species: P. pembaensis

Binomial name
- Perrindema pembaensis Lacroix & Montreuil, 2013

Species of beetle

Perrindema pembaensis is a species of beetle of the family Scarabaeidae. It is found in Mozambique.

== Description ==
Adults reach a length of about 17–21 mm (0.67–0.83 in). They have an elongated, chestnut brown body, with the elytra sometimes turning black.
