= Achloa delicatula =

Scientific classification
- Kingdom: Animalia
- Phylum: Arthropoda
- Clade: Pancrustacea
- Class: Insecta
- Order: Coleoptera
- Suborder: Polyphaga
- Infraorder: Scarabaeiformia
- Family: Scarabaeidae
- Genus: Achloa
- Species: A. delicatula

Binomial name
- Achloa delicatula Péringuey, 1904

Species of beetle

Achloa delicatula is a species of beetle of the family Scarabaeidae. It is found in South Africa (Western Cape).

== Description ==
Adults reach a length of about 10–10.5 mm (0.39–0.41 in). They are similar in shape, size, colour, and sculpture to Achloa helvola but differ in the shape of the clypeus which is plainly narrowed laterally towards the anterior part the outer angles of which are much rounded, the marginal reflexed part is plainly sinuated, and even incised at the centre.
