= Tanyproctus feai =

Scientific classification
- Kingdom: Animalia
- Phylum: Arthropoda
- Class: Insecta
- Order: Coleoptera
- Suborder: Polyphaga
- Infraorder: Scarabaeiformia
- Family: Scarabaeidae
- Genus: Tanyproctus
- Species: T. feai

Binomial name
- Tanyproctus feai Lacroix, 1997

Species of beetle

Tanyproctus feai is a species of beetle of the family Scarabaeidae. It is found in Myanmar.

== Description ==
Adults reach a length of about 10.5 mm. They have a slightly elongated, rather oval body. The forebody is dark brown and the elytra are lighter reddish-brown. The upper surface is glabrous and shiny.
