= Aegostheta brachiata =

Scientific classification
- Kingdom: Animalia
- Phylum: Arthropoda
- Class: Insecta
- Order: Coleoptera
- Suborder: Polyphaga
- Infraorder: Scarabaeiformia
- Family: Scarabaeidae
- Genus: Aegostheta
- Species: A. brachiata

Binomial name
- Aegostheta brachiata Péringuey, 1904

Species of beetle

Aegostheta brachiata is a species of beetle of the family Scarabaeidae. It is found in South Africa (Northern Cape, Eastern Cape, North West).

== Description ==
Adults reach a length of about 19.5–23.5 mm (0.77–0.93 in). Males are black, with chestnut-red elytra. The pronotum is covered with nearly contiguous, round, deep punctures, with the intervals somewhat raised in the posterior part, and a median longitudinal smooth line, slightly raised, and obliterated at both ends, the margins bear traces of a band of appressed, flavescent hairs, denser and thicker laterally. The elytra are covered with moderately broad, irregularly yet closely set punctures the intervals of which are somewhat coriaceous, especially laterally, and having in addition to the plain sutural stria two geminate ones on the disk, and an elongated impression under the humeral callus, each puncture bears a very minute hair almost always obliterated, but less so along the margins and the suture, the outer margin has a row of equi-distant somewhat stiff bristly hairs. Females are more massively build than males. Their head and pronotum are black, the elytra chestnut-red, the legs piceous and the abdomen and pectus reddish.
