= Atanyproctus afghanus =

Scientific classification
- Kingdom: Animalia
- Phylum: Arthropoda
- Class: Insecta
- Order: Coleoptera
- Suborder: Polyphaga
- Infraorder: Scarabaeiformia
- Family: Scarabaeidae
- Genus: Atanyproctus
- Species: A. afghanus

Binomial name
- Atanyproctus afghanus Petrovitz, 1968

Species of beetle

Atanyproctus afghanus is a species of beetle of the family Scarabaeidae. It is found in Afghanistan.

== Description ==
Adults reach a length of about 7.8 mm. They have an almost parallel, shiny, reddish-brown body. The strongly notched, ciliate sides of the pronotum run from the middle anteriorly straight into the somewhat projecting, pointed anterior angles. There are medium-sized, round punctures scattered on the disc. There are double-punctate striae on the elytra and the intervals are large, fairly densely punctate, laterally and at the tips with some obliquely erect setae.
