= Pimelomera =

Scientific classification
- Kingdom: Animalia
- Phylum: Arthropoda
- Clade: Pancrustacea
- Class: Insecta
- Order: Coleoptera
- Suborder: Polyphaga
- Infraorder: Scarabaeiformia
- Family: Scarabaeidae
- Subfamily: Melolonthinae
- Tribe: Tanyproctini
- Genus: Pimelomera; Moser, 1924

Genus of leaf beetles

Pimelomera is a genus of beetles belonging to the family Scarabaeidae.

== Species ==
- Pimelomera goossensi Lacroix, 2005
- Pimelomera onorei Lacroix, 2005
- Pimelomera schwetzi Moser, 1924
