= Achloa caffra =

Scientific classification
- Kingdom: Animalia
- Phylum: Arthropoda
- Clade: Pancrustacea
- Class: Insecta
- Order: Coleoptera
- Suborder: Polyphaga
- Infraorder: Scarabaeiformia
- Family: Scarabaeidae
- Genus: Achloa
- Species: A. caffra

Binomial name
- Achloa caffra Erichson, 1840

Species of beetle

Achloa caffra is a species of beetle of the family Scarabaeidae. It is found in South Africa.

== Description ==
Adults reach a length of about 10.5 mm (0.41 in). They are black, clothed with greyish villose hairs, and with the elytra fuscous. The body is piceous and shining, while the head and pronotum are black. The antennae are testaceous and the frontal part of the head is unequally punctate and clothed with greyish hairs. The clypeus is concave and smooth. The thorax is as broad as the elytra, slightly narrowed in front, rounded laterally, emarginate at the apex, sub-bisinuate at the base with the posterior angles moderately obtuse, slightly convex, closely, not at all strongly punctate, the sides somewhat smooth and more densely pilose, the hairs greyish. The scutellum is sparingly punctate and clothed with decumbent greyish hairs. The elytra are more densely and finely closely punctate, glabrous, testaceo-fuscous with the margin darker. The pygidium is smooth, the penultimate segment with a short, depressed pubescence, the last one with long hairs.
