= Pachydema jeannei =

Scientific classification
- Kingdom: Animalia
- Phylum: Arthropoda
- Clade: Pancrustacea
- Class: Insecta
- Order: Coleoptera
- Suborder: Polyphaga
- Infraorder: Scarabaeiformia
- Family: Scarabaeidae
- Genus: Pachydema
- Species: P. jeannei

Binomial name
- Pachydema jeannei Baraud, 1980

Species of beetle

Pachydema jeannei is a species of beetle of the family Scarabaeidae. It is found on the Canary Islands.

== Description ==
Adults reach a length of about 10.5 mm (0.41 in). They are chestnut brown, with the disc of the pronotum darkened and the antennae (including the club) light yellowish-brown.
