= Paraclitopa =

Scientific classification
- Kingdom: Animalia
- Phylum: Arthropoda
- Class: Insecta
- Order: Coleoptera
- Suborder: Polyphaga
- Infraorder: Scarabaeiformia
- Family: Scarabaeidae
- Subfamily: Melolonthinae
- Tribe: Tanyproctini
- Genus: Paraclitopa; Waterhouse, 1875

Genus of leaf beetles

Paraclitopa is a genus of beetles belonging to the family Scarabaeidae.

== Species ==
- Paraclitopa fuscipennis Moser, 1919
- Paraclitopa lanuginosa Waterhouse, 1875
