= Scaphorhina hirsuta =

Scientific classification
- Kingdom: Animalia
- Phylum: Arthropoda
- Class: Insecta
- Order: Coleoptera
- Suborder: Polyphaga
- Infraorder: Scarabaeiformia
- Family: Scarabaeidae
- Genus: Scaphorhina
- Species: S. hirsuta

Binomial name
- Scaphorhina hirsuta (Péringuey, 1904)

Synonyms
- Aipeiopsis hirsuta Péringuey, 1904

Species of beetle

Scaphorhina hirsuta is a species of beetle of the family Scarabaeidae. It is found in Namibia, Zambia and Zimbabwe.

== Description ==
Adults reach a length of about 18 mm (0.71 in). They are reddish-brown, with the elytra light chestnut-brown, the club of the antennae flavescent, and the frontal part, pronotum, scutellum, and pectus clothed with a very long and very dense fulvous pubescence. The propygidium and pygidium have appressed, sub-flavescent, fine hairs similar to but not so dense as those clothing the sides of the abdomen. The elytra have a very short, appressed flavescent pubescence springing from the extremely closely set, fine punctures.
