= Aliaclitopa snizeki =

Scientific classification
- Kingdom: Animalia
- Phylum: Arthropoda
- Class: Insecta
- Order: Coleoptera
- Suborder: Polyphaga
- Infraorder: Scarabaeiformia
- Family: Scarabaeidae
- Genus: Aliaclitopa
- Species: A. snizeki

Binomial name
- Aliaclitopa snizeki Lacroix, 2003

Species of beetle

Aliaclitopa snizeki is a species of beetle of the family Scarabaeidae. It is found in Zimbabwe.

== Description ==
Adults reach a length of about 13 mm (0.51 in).
