= Periclitopa brenskei =

Scientific classification
- Kingdom: Animalia
- Phylum: Arthropoda
- Class: Insecta
- Order: Coleoptera
- Suborder: Polyphaga
- Infraorder: Scarabaeiformia
- Family: Scarabaeidae
- Genus: Periclitopa
- Species: P. brenskei

Binomial name
- Periclitopa brenskei Brancsik, 1897

Species of beetle

Periclitopa brenskei is a species of beetle of the family Scarabaeidae. It is found in Mozambique.

== Description ==
Adults reach a length of about 15–18 mm (0.59–0.71 in). They are piceous, the pectus and thorax clothed with long greyish hairs, which are fulvous, shorter and dense on the vertex and mouth parts. The clypeus is roughly punctate and sprinkled with hairs and the antennae are piceous. The thorax is black with the disk very closely punctate, the punctures sub-rugulose. The elytra are pale yellowish, with the lateral, apical, and sutural margins darker, densely punctate, with the punctures now and then sub-rugulose, and bearing short, greyish hairs. The dorsal part bears three very obsolete raised lines, and the lateral margin is fringed with long ciliate hairs, especially towards the shoulders. The pygidium is more sparingly punctate than the elytra.
