= Tanyproctus parallelus =

Scientific classification
- Kingdom: Animalia
- Phylum: Arthropoda
- Class: Insecta
- Order: Coleoptera
- Suborder: Polyphaga
- Infraorder: Scarabaeiformia
- Family: Scarabaeidae
- Genus: Tanyproctus
- Species: T. parallelus

Binomial name
- Tanyproctus parallelus Petrovitz, 1968

Species of beetle

Tanyproctus parallelus is a species of beetle of the family Scarabaeidae. It is found in Iran.

== Description ==
Adults reach a length of about 8.2 mm. They have a shiny, light reddish-brown, very narrow, parallel body. The antennae are yellow. The pronotum is margined all around and the sides have spiny setae in the anterior half and the anterior margin is fringed with short cilia. The outer margin of the elytra is fringed with spiny setae in the anterior part, but is otherwise bristly.
