= Pseudachloa leonina =

Scientific classification
- Kingdom: Animalia
- Phylum: Arthropoda
- Class: Insecta
- Order: Coleoptera
- Suborder: Polyphaga
- Infraorder: Scarabaeiformia
- Family: Scarabaeidae
- Genus: Pseudachloa
- Species: P. leonina

Binomial name
- Pseudachloa leonina Péringuey, 1904

Species of beetle

Pseudachloa leonina is a species of beetle of the family Scarabaeidae. It is found in South Africa (Free State, Mpumalanga, Limpopo, KwaZulu-Natal).

== Description ==
Adults reach a length of about 15.5–16 mm (0.61–0.63 in). They are very light chestnut, somewhat testaceous, with the head, pronotum, scutellum and the whole underside clothed with a thick, long, fulvous pubescence almost as dense as in some species of Sparrmannia. The clypeus is finely, and the head more deeply punctured, each puncture bearing a long setulose, erect hair. The pronotum and scutellum are finely yet deeply and closely punctured. The elytra are slightly tri-costulate on each side and faintly striate on each side of the costules, covered with somewhat scattered, somewhat deep punctures, most of which bear a somewhat long, appressed light fulvous hair, arranged in longitudinal rows, the outer margins have a fringe of long, sub-ciliate hairs. The propygidium and pygidium are clothed with a dense appressed, light pubescence, which is very long and fulvous on the abdomen and legs, and very dense on the pectus.
