= Canudema socotrae =

Scientific classification
- Kingdom: Animalia
- Phylum: Arthropoda
- Class: Insecta
- Order: Coleoptera
- Suborder: Polyphaga
- Infraorder: Scarabaeiformia
- Family: Scarabaeidae
- Genus: Canudema
- Species: C. socotrae

Binomial name
- Canudema socotrae Lacroix, 1994

Species of beetle

Canudema socotrae is a species of beetle of the family Scarabaeidae. It is found in Yemen (Socotra).

== Description ==
Adults reach a length of about 14.2–14.8 mm. They have an elongate, almost parallel, black body, with the extremities and elytra dark brownish. The pronotum and elytra are finely whitish tomentose, with small whitish hairs.
