= Phalangonyx mirzayani =

Scientific classification
- Kingdom: Animalia
- Phylum: Arthropoda
- Class: Insecta
- Order: Coleoptera
- Suborder: Polyphaga
- Infraorder: Scarabaeiformia
- Family: Scarabaeidae
- Genus: Phalangonyx
- Species: P. mirzayani

Binomial name
- Phalangonyx mirzayani (Petrovitz, 1968)

Synonyms
- Tanyproctus mirzayani Petrovitz, 1968

Species of beetle

Phalangonyx mirzayani is a species of beetle of the family Scarabaeidae. It is found in Iran.

== Description ==
Adults reach a length of about 9–11.3 mm. They have a parallel to narrowly ovate, shiny, yellowish-brown body, with the outer margin of the clypeus narrowly blackened, and with yellow antennae. The anterior half of the pronotal sides and elytra are thickly spiny, while the margins of the clypeus and the remaining part of the pronotal and elytral margins bristly ciliate.
