= Pleistophylla =

Scientific classification
- Kingdom: Animalia
- Phylum: Arthropoda
- Clade: Pancrustacea
- Class: Insecta
- Order: Coleoptera
- Suborder: Polyphaga
- Infraorder: Scarabaeiformia
- Family: Scarabaeidae
- Subfamily: Melolonthinae
- Tribe: Tanyproctini
- Genus: Pleistophylla; Péringuey, 1904
- Species: P. singularis

Binomial name
- Pleistophylla singularis Péringuey, 1904

Genus of beetles

Pleistophylla is a genus of beetle of the family Scarabaeidae. It is monotypic, being represented by the single species, Pleistophylla singularis, which is found in South Africa (Gauteng, Free State).

== Description ==
Adults reach a length of about 10.5–11.5 mm (0.41–0.45 in). The head and pronotum are brownish-red, while the elytra are chestnut-brown and the antennae and underside are pale testaceous. The whole of the frontal part and the outer and basal margins of the pronotum are densely villose, and the pectus and femora are clothed with a very long, dense, light fulvous pubescence. The whole of the head (the clypeus included), is covered with scabrose, nearly contiguous punctures. The pronotum is closely and finely punctured and glabrous, and the elytra are also glabrous, but with a small fringe of hairs. They are also deeply and somewhat coarsely punctate, and have on each side four costa. The inner one of which is more developed than the others. The scutellum is glabrous, punctate, and has a median raised line. The pygidium has a fringe of long hairs not set close to each other.
