= Eucyclophylla lata =

Scientific classification
- Kingdom: Animalia
- Phylum: Arthropoda
- Class: Insecta
- Order: Coleoptera
- Suborder: Polyphaga
- Infraorder: Scarabaeiformia
- Family: Scarabaeidae
- Genus: Eucyclophylla
- Species: E. lata

Binomial name
- Eucyclophylla lata Waterhouse, 1875

Species of beetle

Eucyclophylla lata is a species of beetle of the family Scarabaeidae. It is found in South Africa (Western Cape).

== Description ==
Adults reach a length of about 17–17.5 mm (0.67–0.69 in). They have a short, broad, fuscous body, with the elytra dark-chestnut and clothed with a very dense, short, appressed light fulvous pubescence. The head is moderately pubescent, the pronotum, pectus, and femora are clothed with a long, dense greyish-white pubescence, and the abdomen with dense appressed hairs of the same colour. The club of the antennae is fulvous and the clypeus and frontal part covered with deep, round, somewhat large, nearly contiguous punctures which are, however, very much finer in the posterior part.
