= Pachydema =

Scientific classification
- Kingdom: Animalia
- Phylum: Arthropoda
- Clade: Pancrustacea
- Class: Insecta
- Order: Coleoptera
- Suborder: Polyphaga
- Infraorder: Scarabaeiformia
- Family: Scarabaeidae
- Subfamily: Melolonthinae
- Tribe: Tanyproctini
- Genus: Pachydema; Laporte, 1832

Synonyms
- Oromiella López-Colón, 1992; Oromia López-Colón, 1989; Pachydema (Physopalpus) Heyden, 1899; Pachydema (Phygotoxeuma) Brenske, 1897; Flatipalpus Fairmaire, 1873; Sparophysa Burmeister, 1855; Ootoma Blanchard, 1850; Artia Rambur, 1843; Phlexis Erichson, 1841; Dasysterna Dejean, 1833

Genus of leaf beetles

Pachydema is a genus of beetles belonging to the family Scarabaeidae.

== Species ==
- Pachydema abeillei Fairmaire, 1881
- Pachydema adusta Karsch, 1881
- Pachydema albipilis Reitter, 1902
- Pachydema albolanosa (Fairmaire, 1873)
- Pachydema ameliae López-Colón, 1986
- Pachydema amphicomella Peyerimhoff, 1943
- Pachydema angustipalpis Normand, 1951
- Pachydema anthracina Fairmaire, 1860
- Pachydema antoinei Baraud, 1979
- Pachydema ariasi Escalera, 1914
- Pachydema autumnalis Normand, 1915
- Pachydema bertiae Baraud, 1982
- Pachydema bipartita (Brullé, 1839)
- Pachydema buettikeri Sabatinelli & Pontuale, 1998
- Pachydema bullata Burmeister, 1855
- Pachydema caesariata Normand, 1925
- Pachydema cambeforti Chavanon & Zirari, 1998
- Pachydema cartaginensis (Rambur, 1843)
- Pachydema cartereaui Fairmaire, 1868
- Pachydema castanea (Brullé, 1839)
- Pachydema cinctipennis Peyerimhoff, 1945
- Pachydema concinna Burmeister, 1855
- Pachydema confinalis Peyerimhoff, 1945
- Pachydema conica Reitter, 1902
- Pachydema curvipedes Escalera, 1914
- Pachydema daoudii Chavanon & Labrique, 2013
- Pachydema decorosa Normand, 1936
- Pachydema demoflysi Normand, 1938
- Pachydema doriae Fairmaire, 1875
- Pachydema doumeti Mayet, 1887
- Pachydema doursi Lucas, 1859
- Pachydema dubitalis Reitter, 1902
- Pachydema emflusi Escalera, 1914
- Pachydema eremicola Peyerimhoff, 1927
- Pachydema fortunatorum Baraud, 1985
- Pachydema foveiceps Marseul, 1878
- Pachydema foveola Lucas, 1859
- Pachydema fuscipennis (Brullé, 1839)
- Pachydema getula Baraud, 1979
- Pachydema girardi Baraud, 1982
- Pachydema gomerae López-Colón, 1999
- Pachydema gourvesi Baraud, 1985
- Pachydema grandipalpis Reitter, 1902
- Pachydema hingrati Chavanon & François, 2015
- Pachydema hiribarnei Keith, 2023
- Pachydema hirticollis (Fabricius, 1787)
- Pachydema hontoriai Escalera, 1914
- Pachydema hornbecki Lucas, 1859
- Pachydema icositana Baraud, 1979
- Pachydema immanipalpis Baraud, 1979
- Pachydema immatura Burmeister, 1855
- Pachydema integra (Wollaston, 1864)
- Pachydema israelitica Crotch, 1872
- Pachydema jeannei Baraud, 1980
- Pachydema lamollei Miessen, 2024
- Pachydema lamotteae Miessen, 2000
- Pachydema lesnei Peyerimhoff, 1927
- Pachydema lethierryi Lucas, 1861
- Pachydema lopadusanorum Sparacio, La Mantia & Bellavista, 2018
- Pachydema lucasi Reiche, 1859
- Pachydema lucianae Peyerimhoff, 1925
- Pachydema marmottani Fairmaire, 1868
- Pachydema marraquensis Escalera, 1914
- Pachydema megalops Micó, 2009
- Pachydema menieri Baraud, 1985
- Pachydema mogadorica Escalera, 1914
- Pachydema monodi Lacroix, 1999
- Pachydema mozabensis Baraud, 1979
- Pachydema navatteae Baraud, 1985
- Pachydema nitidicollis Fairmaire, 1876
- Pachydema nocturna Crotch, 1872
- Pachydema normandi Baraud, 1979
- Pachydema obscura (Brullé, 1839)
- Pachydema obscurata Fairmaire, 1883
- Pachydema obscurella (Wollaston, 1864)
- Pachydema oraniensis Lucas, 1869
- Pachydema oromii López-Colón, 1986
- Pachydema otini Peyerimhoff, 1945
- Pachydema palposa Reitter, 1902
- Pachydema peltastes (Marseul, 1878)
- Pachydema peyerimhoffi Baraud, 1979
- Pachydema phylloperthoides Reitter, 1902
- Pachydema pilosa Walker, 1871
- Pachydema rebellis Normand, 1925
- Pachydema renaudi Chavanon & François, 2014
- Pachydema rubripennis (Lucas, 1848)
- Pachydema rungsi Peyerimhoff, 1945
- Pachydema sancta Crotch, 1872
- Pachydema sbaii Chavanon & François, 2020
- Pachydema schrammi Peyerimhoff, 1945
- Pachydema sicardi Baraud, 1979
- Pachydema sinaitica Crotch, 1872
- Pachydema succidua Normand, 1951
- Pachydema suspiciosa Normand, 1951
- Pachydema tarsalis Reitter, 1902
- Pachydema thysdritana Baraud, 1979
- Pachydema tinerfensis Galante & Stebnicka, 1992
- Pachydema unicolor (Lucas, 1850)
- Pachydema valdani Lucas, 1859
- Pachydema veneriata Normand, 1936
- Pachydema vestita Normand, 1949
- Pachydema volaki Roubal, 1945
- Pachydema wagneri (Erichson, 1841)
- Pachydema wollastoni Peyerimhoff, 1927
- Pachydema xanthochroa Fairmaire, 1879
- Pachydema zohra Normand, 1951
