= Phalangonyx =

Scientific classification
- Kingdom: Animalia
- Phylum: Arthropoda
- Class: Insecta
- Order: Coleoptera
- Suborder: Polyphaga
- Infraorder: Scarabaeiformia
- Family: Scarabaeidae
- Subfamily: Melolonthinae
- Tribe: Tanyproctini
- Genus: Phalangonyx; Reitter, 1889

Genus of leaf beetles

Phalangonyx is a genus of beetles belonging to the family Scarabaeidae.

== Species ==
- Phalangonyx bibatillatus (Petrovitz, 1955)
- Phalangonyx buettikeri Sabatinelli & Pontuale, 1998
- Phalangonyx coniceps Reitter, 1889
- Phalangonyx hadhramauticus Decelle, 1982
- Phalangonyx hormozianensis (Petrovitz, 1980)
- Phalangonyx irakanus Arrow, 1932
- Phalangonyx legezini (Gusakov & Klimenko, 2021)
- Phalangonyx mesopotamicus (Medvedev, 1952)
- Phalangonyx mirzayani (Petrovitz, 1968)
- Phalangonyx semenovi (Medvedev, 1952)
