= Otoclinius =

Scientific classification
- Kingdom: Animalia
- Phylum: Arthropoda
- Class: Insecta
- Order: Coleoptera
- Suborder: Polyphaga
- Infraorder: Scarabaeiformia
- Family: Scarabaeidae
- Subfamily: Melolonthinae
- Tribe: Tanyproctini
- Genus: Otoclinius; Brenske, 1896
- Species: O. gracilipes

Binomial name
- Otoclinius gracilipes Brenske, 1896

Genus of beetles

Otoclinius is a genus of beetle of the family Scarabaeidae. It is monotypic, being represented by the single species, Otoclinius gracilipes, which is found in Iran and Pakistan.

== Description ==
Adults reach a length of about 9.5 mm. They have an elongate, light brown body, with the head and pronotum darker. The clypeus is extended into a cone. The elytra are without ribs.
