= Cephaloncheres ugogoensis =

Scientific classification
- Kingdom: Animalia
- Phylum: Arthropoda
- Clade: Pancrustacea
- Class: Insecta
- Order: Coleoptera
- Suborder: Polyphaga
- Infraorder: Scarabaeiformia
- Family: Scarabaeidae
- Genus: Cephaloncheres
- Species: C. ugogoensis

Binomial name
- Cephaloncheres ugogoensis Brenske, 1898

Species of beetle

Cephaloncheres ugogoensis is a species of beetle of the family Scarabaeidae. It is found in Kenya and Tanzania.

== Description ==
Adults reach a length of about 20 mm (0.79 in). They have a brown, glossy, broad body. The head, pronotum and thorax are densely haired, the body less so. The clypeus is evenly rounded, densely covered with coarse, backward-pointing setae, as is the frons. The pronotum is evenly rounded anteriorly, the lateral margin weakly curved, straight posteriorly, the hind angles slightly rounded, finely punctate, and densely covered with long, backward-pointing hairs. Between these, the hairs thicken into a tuft. In front of the scutellum, the hairs become tufted. The scutellum is very densely and finely punctate. The elytra are wrinkled, densely punctate, with short hairs, somewhat coarser at the suture, somewhat smoother at the apex, with four very indistinct, fine ribs, and a firm impression below the shoulder. The elongated pygidium is finely punctate.
