= Trichinopus flavipennis =

Scientific classification
- Kingdom: Animalia
- Phylum: Arthropoda
- Class: Insecta
- Order: Coleoptera
- Suborder: Polyphaga
- Infraorder: Scarabaeiformia
- Family: Scarabaeidae
- Genus: Trichinopus
- Species: T. flavipennis

Binomial name
- Trichinopus flavipennis Waterhouse, 1875

Species of beetle

Trichinopus flavipennis is a species of beetle of the family Scarabaeidae. It is found in Botswana and Namibia.

== Description ==
Adults reach a length of about 9.5 mm (0.37 in). The head is black, while the clypeus, pronotum and legs are reddish, and the antennae and underside flavescent and the elytra pale straw-coloured. The pronotum has somewhat scattered punctures bearing each a very long erect hair equal in length to those forming a dense fringe along the outer margins, the punctures are a little more closely set on each side of the median part of the disk, which has, however, an impunctate longitudinal band, the basal part is sinuate and has a somewhat deep impression in the centre of the sinuation. The scutellum is very densely hairy, the flavescent hairs appressed and the elytra are deeply and irregularly punctate, each puncture bearing an erect setulose hair, they are faintly bi-striate on the dorsal part in addition to the plain juxta-sutural stria, and the outer margins have a thick fringe of hairs as long as those on the pronotum, the pubescence on the pygidial part, the abdomen, the pectus, and the femora is also very long and not appressed.
