= Aegostheta natalensis =

Scientific classification
- Kingdom: Animalia
- Phylum: Arthropoda
- Class: Insecta
- Order: Coleoptera
- Suborder: Polyphaga
- Infraorder: Scarabaeiformia
- Family: Scarabaeidae
- Genus: Aegostheta
- Species: A. natalensis

Binomial name
- Aegostheta natalensis (Péringuey, 1904)

Synonyms
- Macrophylla natalensis Péringuey, 1904

Species of beetle

Aegostheta natalensis is a species of beetle of the family Scarabaeidae. It is found in South Africa (KwaZulu-Natal).

== Description ==
Adults reach a length of about 14 mm (0.55 in). They are entirely testaceous-red, shining, and glabrous on the upper side except for a thick fringe of flavescent hairs along the base, and a finer one along the outer margin of the elytra. The clypeus is covered, like the head, with closely set, deep, somewhat rounded punctures. The pronotum is covered with round, fairly deep punctures not very closely set, and the scutellum is hardly punctate. The elytra have two fairly distinct costules, and are covered with deep, round punctures separated by an interval narrower than their diameter. The pygidium is, like the abdominal segments, very slightly pubescent.
