= Diaclaspus delagoensis =

Scientific classification
- Kingdom: Animalia
- Phylum: Arthropoda
- Class: Insecta
- Order: Coleoptera
- Suborder: Polyphaga
- Infraorder: Scarabaeiformia
- Family: Scarabaeidae
- Genus: Diaclaspus
- Species: D. delagoensis

Binomial name
- Diaclaspus delagoensis Brenske, 1896

Synonyms
- Cyclomera delagoensis

Species of beetle

Diaclaspus delagoensis is a species of beetle of the family Scarabaeidae. It is found in Mozambique.

== Description ==
Adults reach a length of about 19.5–23 mm (0.77–0.91 in). They are chestnut-red, with the elytra slightly darker. The palpi and antennae are somewhat ferruginous, with the club sub-flavescent. The clypeus and frontal part are briefly pubescent, the pubescence longer and erect on the vertex. The pronotum and scutellum are clothed with a long appressed flavescent pubescence, not dense enough to hide the sculpture. The elytra are also clothed with very minute appressed fine hairs and the abdomen and pygidium have fine appressed hairs.
