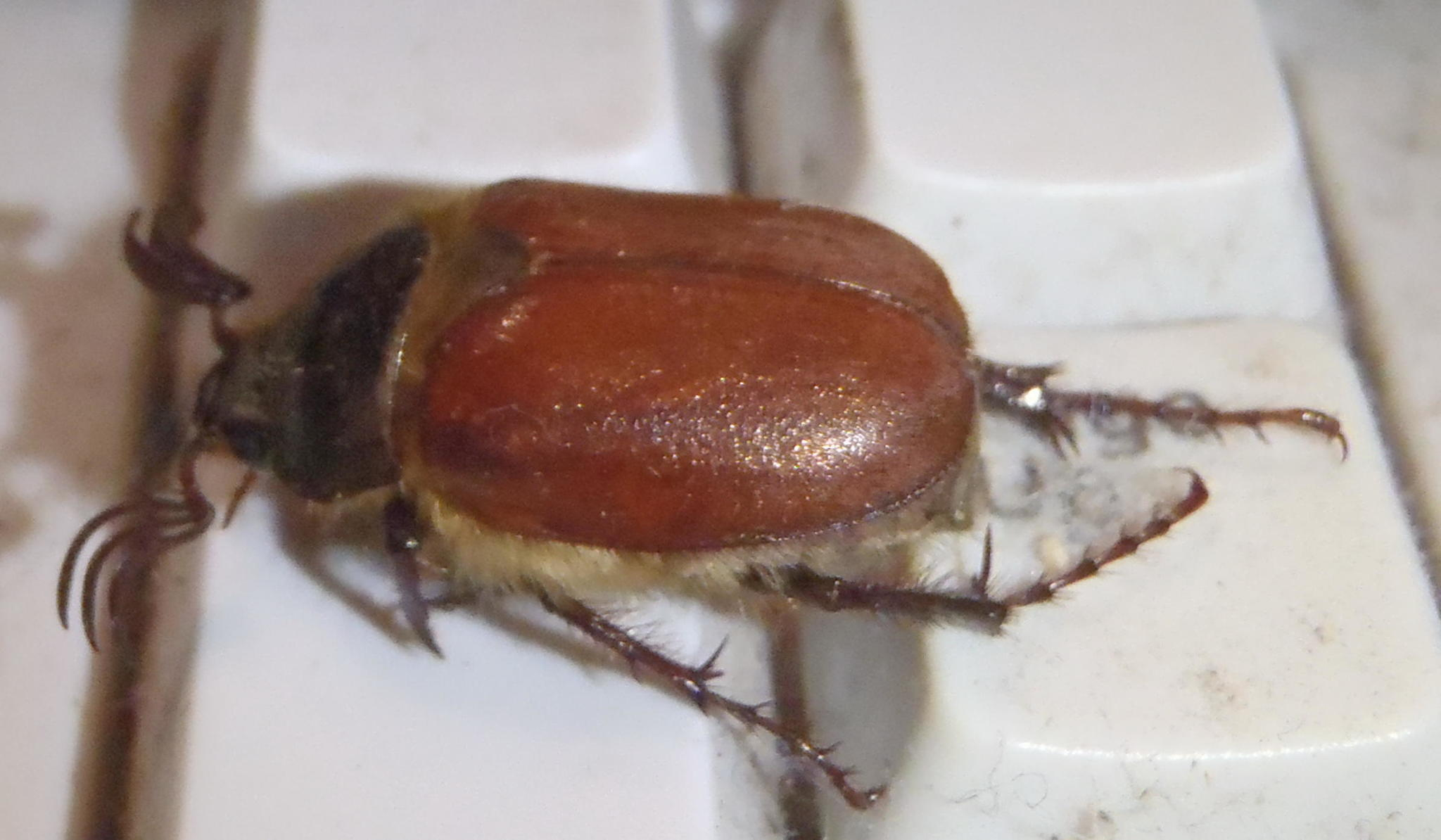
- Aegostheta sp.

Scientific classification
- Kingdom: Animalia
- Phylum: Arthropoda
- Class: Insecta
- Order: Coleoptera
- Suborder: Polyphaga
- Infraorder: Scarabaeiformia
- Family: Scarabaeidae
- Subfamily: Melolonthinae
- Tribe: Tanyproctini; Erichson, 1847

Synonyms
- Elaphocerini Blanchard, 1851 (Unav.); Achloidae Burmeister, 1855; Cephalotrichiadae Burmeister, 1855; Leptopodidae Burmeister, 1855 (Homonym); Macrophyllidae Burmeister, 1855; Pachydemidae Burmeister, 1855; Sparrmannini Péringuey, 1904; Aegosthetini Lacroix, 2007

= Tanyproctini =

Tribe of beetles

Tanyproctini is a tribe of May beetles and June bugs in the family Scarabaeidae, historically often referred to by the junior synonym Pachydemini.

== Genera ==
- Aegosthetina Lacroix, 2007
  - Aegostheta Dejean, 1833
- Tanyproctina Erichson, 1847
  - Achelyna Erichson, 1848
  - Achloa Erichson, 1840
  - Acylochilus Ohaus, 1909
  - Aglaphyra Brenske, 1896
  - Alaia Petrovitz, 1980
  - Aliaclitopa Lacroix, 2003
  - Anahi Martinez, 1958
  - Anamatochoranus Lacroix, 1995
  - Anomolyna Fairmaire, 1897
  - Antandroyanus Lacroix, 1993
  - Asiactenius Nikolajev, 2000
  - Atanyproctus Petrovitz, 1954
  - Brenskeiella Berg, 1898
  - Buettikeria Sabatinelli & Pontuale, 1998
  - Burmeisteriellus Berg, 1898
  - Camerounophylla Lacroix, 2005
  - Campylophyllus Decelle, 1979
  - Canudema Lacroix, 1994
  - Castanochilus Ohaus, 1909
  - Castelnauphylla Lacroix, 1999
  - Cephaloncheres Brenske, 1898
  - Ceramida Baraud, 1987
  - Clitopa Erichson, 1847
  - Clomecyra Lacroix, 1999
  - Cochinchidema Lacroix, 1996
  - Cyclomera Klug, 1855
  - Debutina Lacroix, 1993
  - Decellophylla Lacroix, 2005
  - Dechambrophylla Lacroix, 1999
  - Diaclaspus Brenske, 1896
  - Diacucephalus Dewailly, 1950
  - Eideria Neita & Ocampo, 2012
  - Elaphocera Gene, 1836
  - Elaphocerella Moser, 1919
  - Empycastes Gerstaecker, 1871
  - Erigavo Lacroix, 2006
  - Eucyclophylla Waterhouse, 1875
  - Europtron Marseul, 1867
  - Eurypeza Lacroix, 2006
  - Eximidema Keith & Reichenbach, 2018
  - Falsotoclinius Keith & Montreuil, 2004
  - Goniorrhina Quedenfeldt, 1888
  - Griveaudella Lacroix, 1993
  - Hemictenius Reitter, 1897
  - Ihosyus Montreuil & Lacroix, 2020
  - Jalalabadia Balthasar, 1967
  - Kabindeknomiosoma Lacroix, 2005
  - Kadlecia Frey, 1965
  - Kenyatopadema Lacroix, 2009
  - Kraseophylla Péringuey, 1904
  - Kryzhanovskia Nikolajev & Kabakov, 1977
  - Lachnodera Erichson, 1847
  - Lacroixidema Keith, 2000
  - Lazomba Allsopp & Schoolmeesters, 2024
  - Leptochristina Baraud & Branco, 1991
  - Leuretra Erichson, 1847
  - Lichniops Gutiérrez, 1946
  - Lichniopsoides Martinez, 1953
  - Limepomera Lacroix, 1999
  - Longicrura Frey, 1974
  - Mahafalyanus Lacroix, 1993
  - Makoanus Lacroix, 1993
  - Malawinophylla Lacroix, 2013
  - Merinanus Lacroix, 1993
  - Myloxenoides Martinez, 1975
  - Neoclitopa Lacroix, 1997
  - Oedanomerus Waterhouse, 1875
  - Oncochirus Kolbe, 1891
  - Onochaeta Erichson, 1847
  - Otoclinius Brenske, 1896
  - Pachnessa Brenske, 1894
  - Pachycolus Erichson, 1847
  - Pachydema Laporte, 1832
  - Pachydemocera Reitter, 1902
  - Pachypoides Fairmaire, 1884
  - Palacephala Lacroix, 1999
  - Paraclitopa Waterhouse, 1875
  - Parapetiia Martinez, 1961
  - Pasaphylla Péringuey, 1904
  - Pentacoryna Moser, 1926
  - Periclitopa Brenske, 1896
  - Periproctoides Lacroix, 2006
  - Periproctus Kolbe, 1910
  - Perrindema Lacroix, 1997
  - Phalangonyx Reitter, 1889
  - Phalangosoma Quedenfeldt, 1884
  - Pimelomera Moser, 1924
  - Pleistophylla Péringuey, 1904
  - Plesiopalacephala Lacroix, 2006
  - Protoclitopa Decelle, 1979
  - Pseudachloa Péringuey, 1904
  - Pseudoliogenys Moser, 1919
  - Pseudopachydema Balthasar, 1930
  - Pseudoperiproctus Keith & Reichenbach, 2018
  - Pseustophylla Péringuey, 1904
  - Puelchesia Ocampo & Smith, 2006
  - Robinsonelliana Lacroix, 1996
  - Rubilepis Dewailly, 1950
  - Sabatinellius Montreuil & Lacroix, 2020
  - Scapanoclypeus Evans, 1987
  - Scaphorhina Quedenfeldt, 1884
  - Sebaris Laporte, 1840
  - Selomothus Fairmaire, 1891
  - Socotraproctus Král, Sehnal & Bezděk, 2012
  - Sparrmannia Laporte, 1840
  - Synclitopa Kolbe, 1897
  - Tanyproctoides Petrovitz, 1971
  - Tanyproctus Ménétriés, 1832
  - Taphrocephala Quedenfeldt, 1888
  - Thoracotrichia Decelle, 1968
  - Tiamidema Prokofiev, 2014
  - Tlaocera Péringuey, 1904
  - Trichinopus Waterhouse, 1875
  - Trichiodera Burmeister, 1855
  - Triodontonyx Moser, 1921
  - Vezoanus Lacroix, 1993
  - Zimbabuephylla Lacroix, 1997
- Subtribe Not assigned
  - †Ceafornotensis Woolley, 2016
  - †Eophyllocerus Haupt, 1950
  - Luispenaia Martinez, 1972
