= Achelyna clypeata =

Scientific classification
- Kingdom: Animalia
- Phylum: Arthropoda
- Clade: Pancrustacea
- Class: Insecta
- Order: Coleoptera
- Suborder: Polyphaga
- Infraorder: Scarabaeiformia
- Family: Scarabaeidae
- Genus: Achelyna
- Species: A. clypeata

Binomial name
- Achelyna clypeata Burmeister, 1855

Species of beetle

Achelyna clypeata is a species of beetle of the family Scarabaeidae. It is found in South Africa (Gauteng).

== Description ==
Adults reach a length of about 8 mm (0.31 in). They are fuscous-brown, with the elytra, abdomen, and legs chestnut-brown and with the palpi and antennae flavous. The frontal part bears long, fulvous hairs and the pronotum has a lateral fringe of similar hairs, while the pectus is only moderately hairy. The pronotum is glabrous on the disk and covered with fine, closely set round punctures, the base is pubescent in front of the scutellum which is glabrous. The elytra are covered with somewhat deep but not broad, nearly equi-distant punctures, the juxta-sutural stria is very plain, and there are three somewhat faint ones on each side. The propygidium is almost entirely covered by the elytra, and the pygidium is broad, convex, very much drawn forwards and has a fringe of very long, flavescent hairs.
