= Periclitopa varicornis =

Scientific classification
- Kingdom: Animalia
- Phylum: Arthropoda
- Class: Insecta
- Order: Coleoptera
- Suborder: Polyphaga
- Infraorder: Scarabaeiformia
- Family: Scarabaeidae
- Genus: Periclitopa
- Species: P. varicornis

Binomial name
- Periclitopa varicornis Péringuey, 1904

Species of beetle

Periclitopa varicornis is a species of beetle of the family Scarabaeidae. It is found in South Africa (Mpumalanga).

== Description ==
Adults reach a length of about 13–13.5 mm (0.51–0.53 in). They are black, with the elytra light earthy-brown and the vertex of the head, pronotum, scutellum, upper side of the abdominal segments and pectus clothed with a long, dense, greyish pubescence. The antennae are black with the seventh joint as well as the ninth and tenth pale testaceous, and the third inner joint of the club black like the pedicel. The surface of the whole head is strongly shagreened and the hairs on the frontal part are very long. The pronotum is finely shagreened, the scutellum closely punctate and the elytra very faintly costulate, finely shagreened and clothed with very short appressed hairs springing from each interstice. The pygidium is plainly punctulate, each puncture with a somewhat long greyish hair.
