= Tanyproctus iranicus =

Scientific classification
- Kingdom: Animalia
- Phylum: Arthropoda
- Class: Insecta
- Order: Coleoptera
- Suborder: Polyphaga
- Infraorder: Scarabaeiformia
- Family: Scarabaeidae
- Genus: Tanyproctus
- Species: T. iranicus

Binomial name
- Tanyproctus iranicus Petrovitz, 1968

Species of beetle

Tanyproctus iranicus is a species of beetle of the family Scarabaeidae. It is found in Iran.

== Description ==
Adults reach a length of about 7.2—10.2 mm. They have a slender, parallel, reddish-brown body. The edges of the clypeus are blackened, the antennae are yellowish-brown and the edges of the head, the anterior and lateral margins of the pronotum, and the outer margin of the elytra are bristly. The underside is more finely pubescent.
