= Clitopa bohemani =

Scientific classification
- Kingdom: Animalia
- Phylum: Arthropoda
- Class: Insecta
- Order: Coleoptera
- Suborder: Polyphaga
- Infraorder: Scarabaeiformia
- Family: Scarabaeidae
- Genus: Clitopa
- Species: C. bohemani

Binomial name
- Clitopa bohemani Blanchard, 1851

Species of beetle

Clitopa bohemani is a species of beetle of the family Scarabaeidae. It is found in Zimbabwe.

== Description ==
Adults reach a length of about 15–16 mm (0.59–0.63 in). The head, pronotum, scutellum and pygidium are fuscous-brown, while the elytra are bright testaceous with the suture and the outer margins fuscous. The underside and legs are reddish-brown and the antennae and palpi are light ferruginous red. The head and clypeus are coarsely punctate, the latter with a dense covering of upright fulvous hairs, which, however, are replaced on the anterior part of the clypeus, especially on the margin, by stiff ciliate ones. The pronotum is covered with almost contiguous punctures, emitting each a very long decumbent or appressed flavescent hair, forming thus a very dense pubescence. The elytra are covered with irregular punctures each bearing a very short appressed greyish hair. The juxta-sutural stria is distinct, and there are on each side two fairly well marked discoidal costules and a plainer supra-marginal one. The pygidial part has appressed greyish hairs and the abdomen is clothed with a long, very dense greyish pubescence with a slightly flavescent tinge.
