= Achloa helvola =

Scientific classification
- Kingdom: Animalia
- Phylum: Arthropoda
- Clade: Pancrustacea
- Class: Insecta
- Order: Coleoptera
- Suborder: Polyphaga
- Infraorder: Scarabaeiformia
- Family: Scarabaeidae
- Genus: Achloa
- Species: A. helvola

Binomial name
- Achloa helvola Erichson, 1840

Synonyms
- Nanarcta vulpecula Blanchard, 1851

Species of beetle

Achloa helvola is a species of beetle of the family Scarabaeidae. It is found in South Africa (Eastern Cape).

== Description ==
Adults reach a length of about 10–12 mm (0.39–0.47 in). They are very light testaceous, and clothed, except on the elytra which are glabrous, with long, dense flavescent hairs. The clypeus is very sparsely punctulate, each puncture bearing an erect hair, divided from the frontal part by a sutural line which is very strongly arcuated towards the basal part in the centre, frontal part very closely punctured and densely hairy, the hairs erect. The pronotum is somewhat closely punctulate, and clothed with a long, erect pubescence. The scutellum is punctulate and densely hairy and the elytra are glabrous except for a few upright hairs at the base on the inner part of the humeral callus, and a marginal fringe, the setose hairs of which are long. They are very closely punctate, the punctures fine but not of equal size, not costulate but having a distinct juxta-sutural stria obliterated in the posterior part, this stria has a row of remote, erect, setose hairs very often obliterated. The propygidium and pygidium have very long villose hairs which are extremely dense on the pectus.
