= Stephanopholis melolonthoides =

Scientific classification
- Kingdom: Animalia
- Phylum: Arthropoda
- Clade: Pancrustacea
- Class: Insecta
- Order: Coleoptera
- Suborder: Polyphaga
- Infraorder: Scarabaeiformia
- Family: Scarabaeidae
- Genus: Stephanopholis
- Species: S. melolonthoides

Binomial name
- Stephanopholis melolonthoides (Brenske, 1892)

Synonyms
- Rhabdopholis melolonthoides Brenske, 1892; Rhapdopholis melolonthoides (lapsus)

Species of beetle

Stephanopholis melolonthoides is a species of scarab beetle (family Scarabaeidae), belonging to tribe Schizonychini of subfamily Melolonthinae. It is thought to be endemic to Sri Lanka.

This species was formerly placed in genus Rhabdopholis in the related tribe Leucopholini. When Ernst Brenske first described it (as Rhabdopholis melolonthoides), he listed "Africa" as the country of origin. Later, Brenske received specimens that were said to originate from South America, while Arrow stated he had specimens from Colombo (Sri Lanka).

== Description ==
Adults reach a length of about 16–19 mm (0.63–0.75 in). The species name melolonthoides ("cockchafer-like") refers to the similarity of adults of this beetle to Carlschoenherria sulcipennis of the related tribe Melolonthini, which also contains the cockchafers (Melolontha).
