= Psilonychus barkeri =

Scientific classification
- Kingdom: Animalia
- Phylum: Arthropoda
- Clade: Pancrustacea
- Class: Insecta
- Order: Coleoptera
- Suborder: Polyphaga
- Infraorder: Scarabaeiformia
- Family: Scarabaeidae
- Genus: Psilonychus
- Species: P. barkeri

Binomial name
- Psilonychus barkeri Péringuey, 1904

Species of beetle

Psilonychus barkeri is a species of beetle of the family Scarabaeidae. It is found in South Africa (KwaZulu-Natal).

== Description ==
Adults reach a length of about 11.5–12 mm (0.45–0.47 in). Males are narrower and more cylindrical than Psilonychus deridens and Psilonychus eckloni and clothed like P. eckloni with whitish or slightly flavescent scales which form on each elytron four uninterrupted bands separated by three narrow denuded lines. The hairs along the margins of the pronotum, the base especially, are plainly flavous. The clypeus is more sharply emarginate in the centre and narrower than in P. eckloni. The pronotum has a faint median longitudinal impression in the posterior part, and the lateral denuded patch is narrow but distinct. The scutellum is impunctate and the elytra are not costulate, but the denuded lines seem to be slightly raised behind.
