= Scapanoclypeus brunneus =

Scientific classification
- Kingdom: Animalia
- Phylum: Arthropoda
- Clade: Pancrustacea
- Class: Insecta
- Order: Coleoptera
- Suborder: Polyphaga
- Infraorder: Scarabaeiformia
- Family: Scarabaeidae
- Genus: Scapanoclypeus
- Species: S. brunneus

Binomial name
- Scapanoclypeus brunneus Evans, 1987

Species of beetle

Scapanoclypeus brunneus is a species of beetle of the family Scarabaeidae. It is found in Namibia.

== Description ==
Adults reach a length of about 6.6–8 mm. The clypeus is piceous and sparsely setigerously punctate. The frons and vertex are piceous, the pronotum rufo-brunneus and the elytra pale brown.
