= Sparrmannia tridactyla =

Scientific classification
- Kingdom: Animalia
- Phylum: Arthropoda
- Clade: Pancrustacea
- Class: Insecta
- Order: Coleoptera
- Suborder: Polyphaga
- Infraorder: Scarabaeiformia
- Family: Scarabaeidae
- Genus: Sparrmannia
- Species: S. tridactyla

Binomial name
- Sparrmannia tridactyla Evans, 1989

Species of beetle

Sparrmannia tridactyla is a species of beetle of the family Scarabaeidae. It is found in Namibia and South Africa (Cape).

== Description ==
Adults reach a length of about 12–14 mm. The pronotum is covered by long yellowish setae. The elytra are yellowish-brown, with the margins slightly darker than the disc. They are sparsely setose at the basal one-third and there are small, dark setigerous punctures. The disc is weakly puncto-striate. The pygidium is yellowish-brown with scattered setigerous punctures and erect white setae.
