= Psilonychus duponti =

Scientific classification
- Kingdom: Animalia
- Phylum: Arthropoda
- Clade: Pancrustacea
- Class: Insecta
- Order: Coleoptera
- Suborder: Polyphaga
- Infraorder: Scarabaeiformia
- Family: Scarabaeidae
- Genus: Psilonychus
- Species: P. duponti

Binomial name
- Psilonychus duponti Burmeister, 1855

Species of beetle

Psilonychus duponti is a species of beetle of the family Scarabaeidae. It is found in South Africa (KwaZulu-Natal).

== Description ==
Adults reach a length of about 13.5–14 mm (0.53–0.55 in). Males are a little more robust than Psilonychus gracilis and also bronze-green, but with the scales on the upper side finer and much more elongated, and the pattern on the elytra is quite indistinct. The clypeus is plainly hexagonal and the broad denuded walls of the median groove of the pronotum are very plain, but the supra-lateral, basal, denuded patch is sometimes very indistinct, and the outer margins are strongly serrate. The scutellum is impunctate. The elytra are not costulate, but the punctures are deep and seriate. The antennae and palpi are rufescent or piceous.
