= Coniopholis proxima =

Scientific classification
- Kingdom: Animalia
- Phylum: Arthropoda
- Clade: Pancrustacea
- Class: Insecta
- Order: Coleoptera
- Suborder: Polyphaga
- Infraorder: Scarabaeiformia
- Family: Scarabaeidae
- Genus: Coniopholis
- Species: C. proxima

Binomial name
- Coniopholis proxima Péringuey, 1904

Species of beetle

Coniopholis proxima is a species of beetle of the family Scarabaeidae. It is found in South Africa (Mpumalanga).

== Description ==
Adults reach a length of about 15–15.5 mm (0.59–0.61 in). They are nearly identical to Coniopholis lepidiota, and differs mainly by the more finely punctured pronotum and elytra, and the finer white scales. Furthermore, the shape of the genital armature is plainly different.
