= Scapanoclypeus carinatus =

Scientific classification
- Kingdom: Animalia
- Phylum: Arthropoda
- Clade: Pancrustacea
- Class: Insecta
- Order: Coleoptera
- Suborder: Polyphaga
- Infraorder: Scarabaeiformia
- Family: Scarabaeidae
- Genus: Scapanoclypeus
- Species: S. carinatus

Binomial name
- Scapanoclypeus carinatus Evans, 1987

Species of beetle

Scapanoclypeus carinatus is a species of beetle of the family Scarabaeidae. It is found in Namibia and South Africa (Cape Province).

== Description ==
Adults reach a length of about 12 mm. The clypeus is setigerously punctate and the frons and vertex are piceous. The pronotum is castaneous and the elytra fulvous.
