= Scapanoclypeus aulacocoleatus =

Scientific classification
- Kingdom: Animalia
- Phylum: Arthropoda
- Clade: Pancrustacea
- Class: Insecta
- Order: Coleoptera
- Suborder: Polyphaga
- Infraorder: Scarabaeiformia
- Family: Scarabaeidae
- Genus: Scapanoclypeus
- Species: S. aulacocoleatus

Binomial name
- Scapanoclypeus aulacocoleatus Evans, 1987

Species of beetle

Scapanoclypeus aulacocoleatus is a species of beetle of the family Scarabaeidae. It is found in Namibia and South Africa (Cape Province).

== Description ==
Adults reach a length of about 7.5–9 mm. The clypeus is fulvous and setigerously punctate. The frons and vertex are piceous and the pronotum and elytra are fulvous.
