= Bug City (TV series) =

1998 educational TV series

- Genre: Nature documentary
- Directed by: David Yarnell
- Presented by: Arthur V. Evans; Cristina Ricci; Bugsy Seagull (voiced by Chuck McCann)
- Country of origin: United States
- Original language: English

Production
- Running time: 25 minutes
- Production company: Schlessinger Media

Original release
- Release: October 13, 1998

Bug City is a 1998 educational children's series hosted by entomologist Art Evans, actress Christina Ricci and the puppet character "Bugsy Seagull", voiced by Chuck McCann. It was released on VHS by Schlessinger Media.

== Background and development ==
The series was developed by Schlessinger Media as a series of educational videos for children about insects. Dan Markim, then vice president of Schlessinger, came up with the concept for the series while developing the 1996 documentary Alien Empire, about insects, for Time Life. He noted that despite being developed for an adult audience, Alien Empire's subject matter was especially popular with children. Bug City was also partly intended to capitalize on the success of the 1998 animated films A Bug's Life and Antz.

Three 25-minute videos were released on VHS on October 13, 1998. A further ten-episode series was released for use in classrooms. The videos were hosted by entomologist Art Evans, who was director of the Insect Zoo at the Natural History Museum of Los Angeles County, Christina Ricci and a puppet character called "Bugsy Seagull" voiced by Chuck McCann, which provided comic relief. The series focused on the lifecycles and attributes of different species of insects, as well as ways to safely handle them. The series made use of microscopic photography of insects.

== Reception ==
The series received mostly positive reviews, with praise for Evans' work as host and the educational content of the videos, but criticism for Ricci's role as host. Lynne Heffley of Los Angeles Times wrote that "Evans’ commentary and the up-close photography are a fascinating window on a world of leaf-cutters, masters of camouflage, astounding life cycles, defense mechanisms and survival techniques." John W. Shearin of Emergency Librarian praised Evans' presentation skills and the series' educational value, but was critical of Ricci's performance, describing her as seeming "disinterested and only moderately prepared". Amy Kulcak, in a review for Common Sense Media, also praised the subject matter and Evans' presentation, while criticizing Ricci and the character of Bugsy Seagull as "boring".
