= Sparrmannia peringueyi =

Scientific classification
- Kingdom: Animalia
- Phylum: Arthropoda
- Clade: Pancrustacea
- Class: Insecta
- Order: Coleoptera
- Suborder: Polyphaga
- Infraorder: Scarabaeiformia
- Family: Scarabaeidae
- Genus: Sparrmannia
- Species: S. peringueyi

Binomial name
- Sparrmannia peringueyi Evans, 1989

Species of beetle

Sparrmannia peringueyi is a species of beetle of the family Scarabaeidae. It is found in Namibia.

== Description ==
Adults reach a length of about 17–18 mm. The pronotum has long yellowish setae. The elytra are yellowish-brown, with the basal one-third of the disc and the basal half of the lateral portion distinctly setigerously tuberculate (the tubercles are small and dark) and with yellowish, sub-erect setae. The remaining surface is shallowly and irregularly punctate. The pygidium is yellowish-brown, setigerously punctate and moderately clothed with erect or sub-erect white setae.
