= Sparrmannia angola =

Scientific classification
- Kingdom: Animalia
- Phylum: Arthropoda
- Clade: Pancrustacea
- Class: Insecta
- Order: Coleoptera
- Suborder: Polyphaga
- Infraorder: Scarabaeiformia
- Family: Scarabaeidae
- Genus: Sparrmannia
- Species: S. angola

Binomial name
- Sparrmannia angola Evans, 1989

Species of beetle

Sparrmannia angola is a species of beetle of the family Scarabaeidae. It is found in Angola.

== Description ==
Adults reach a length of about 14–15.5 mm. The elytra are dark yellowish-brown, with the lateral margins broadest medially and the disc deeply, irregularly punctate. The pygidium is dark yellowish-brown with scattered setigerous punctures and erect yellowish setae.
