= Glyptoglossa acta =

Scientific classification
- Kingdom: Animalia
- Phylum: Arthropoda
- Clade: Pancrustacea
- Class: Insecta
- Order: Coleoptera
- Suborder: Polyphaga
- Infraorder: Scarabaeiformia
- Family: Scarabaeidae
- Genus: Glyptoglossa
- Species: G. acta

Binomial name
- Glyptoglossa acta Evans, 1988

Species of beetle

Glyptoglossa acta is a species of beetle of the family Scarabaeidae. It is found in South Africa (Northern Cape).

== Description ==
Adults reach a length of about 18.5–19 mm (0.73–0.75 in). They are testaceous to dark testaceous, with the clypeus finely and shallowly punctate and the pronotum setigerously punctate. The setae are long and erect. The elytra is setose at the base, while the rest is shallowly and irregularly punctate and glabrous.
