= Sparrmannia pseudotransvaalica =

Scientific classification
- Kingdom: Animalia
- Phylum: Arthropoda
- Clade: Pancrustacea
- Class: Insecta
- Order: Coleoptera
- Suborder: Polyphaga
- Infraorder: Scarabaeiformia
- Family: Scarabaeidae
- Genus: Sparrmannia
- Species: S. pseudotransvaalica

Binomial name
- Sparrmannia pseudotransvaalica Evans, 1989

Species of beetle

Sparrmannia pseudotransvaalica is a species of beetle of the family Scarabaeidae. It is found in South Africa (Transvaal).

== Description ==
Adults reach a length of about 20.5–25 mm. The pronotum has long yellowish setae. The elytra are light to dark yellowish-brown, with the disc irregularly punctate, glabrous and shining. The pygidium is yellowish-brown, with sparse setigerous punctures and yellowish, erect setae.
