= Sparrmannia vicina =

Scientific classification
- Kingdom: Animalia
- Phylum: Arthropoda
- Clade: Pancrustacea
- Class: Insecta
- Order: Coleoptera
- Suborder: Polyphaga
- Infraorder: Scarabaeiformia
- Family: Scarabaeidae
- Genus: Sparrmannia
- Species: S. vicina

Binomial name
- Sparrmannia vicina Evans, 1989

Species of beetle

Sparrmannia vicina is a species of beetle of the family Scarabaeidae. It is found in Angola.

== Description ==
Adults reach a length of about 20.5–23 mm. The pronotum has long yellowish setae. The elytra are dark yellowish-brown to pale brown, often with the margins slightly darker than the disc. The base has short erect whitish setae, with longer setae scattered along the basal one-third of the suture. The remaining surface is irregularly punctate, glabrous and shining. The pygidium is dark yellowish-brown, with the surface smooth, and with setigerous punctures and white, erect setae.
