= Glyptoglossa alia =

Scientific classification
- Kingdom: Animalia
- Phylum: Arthropoda
- Clade: Pancrustacea
- Class: Insecta
- Order: Coleoptera
- Suborder: Polyphaga
- Infraorder: Scarabaeiformia
- Family: Scarabaeidae
- Genus: Glyptoglossa
- Species: G. alia

Binomial name
- Glyptoglossa alia Evans, 1988

Species of beetle

Glyptoglossa alia is a species of beetle of the family Scarabaeidae. It is found in South Africa (Northern Cape).

== Description ==
Adults reach a length of about 17.5–19 mm (0.69–0.75 in). They are testaceous to dark testaceous, with the clypeus deeply punctate and the pronotum with scattered setigerous punctures. The basal area of the elytra has scattered long setae and the pygidium is glabrous.
