= Sparrmannia ursina =

Scientific classification
- Kingdom: Animalia
- Phylum: Arthropoda
- Clade: Pancrustacea
- Class: Insecta
- Order: Coleoptera
- Suborder: Polyphaga
- Infraorder: Scarabaeiformia
- Family: Scarabaeidae
- Genus: Sparrmannia
- Species: S. ursina

Binomial name
- Sparrmannia ursina Evans, 1989

Species of beetle

Sparrmannia ursina is a species of beetle of the family Scarabaeidae. It is found in Namibia and South Africa (Northern Cape).

== Description ==
Adults reach a length of about 16.5–21.5 mm. The pronotum has long yellowish setae. The elytra are yellowish-brown, with the disc finely, shallowly, and irregularly punctate. The pygidium is yellowish-brown, setigerously punctate and moderately clothed with erect yellowish setae.
