= Psilonychus pilosicollis =

Scientific classification
- Kingdom: Animalia
- Phylum: Arthropoda
- Clade: Pancrustacea
- Class: Insecta
- Order: Coleoptera
- Suborder: Polyphaga
- Infraorder: Scarabaeiformia
- Family: Scarabaeidae
- Genus: Psilonychus
- Species: P. pilosicollis

Binomial name
- Psilonychus pilosicollis (Boheman, 1857)

Synonyms
- Coniopholis pilosicollis Boheman, 1857

Species of beetle

Psilonychus pilosicollis is a species of beetle of the family Scarabaeidae. It is found in South Africa.

== Description ==
Adults reach a length of about 10 mm (0.39 in). They are similar to Psilonychus groendahli, but are about one-third larger. Furthermore, the pubescence of the pronotum is longer, more lanuginose, without any traces of scales, and the punctuation is very much narrower. The costules of the elytra are much less in relief, and the scales are slightly finer.
