= Scapanoclypeus testaceus =

Scientific classification
- Kingdom: Animalia
- Phylum: Arthropoda
- Clade: Pancrustacea
- Class: Insecta
- Order: Coleoptera
- Suborder: Polyphaga
- Infraorder: Scarabaeiformia
- Family: Scarabaeidae
- Genus: Scapanoclypeus
- Species: S. testaceus

Binomial name
- Scapanoclypeus testaceus Evans, 1987

Species of beetle

Scapanoclypeus testaceus is a species of beetle of the family Scarabaeidae. It is found in South Africa (Cape Province).

== Description ==
Adults reach a length of about 5–7 mm. The clypeus, antennae, pronotum and elytra are testaceous, while the frons and vertex are castaneous. There are flavous setae on the pronotum. On the elytra, the lateral and apical margins are darker than the disc and the disc is shallowly, confusedly, setigerously punctate, with flavous setae.
