= Sparrmannia acicularis =

Scientific classification
- Kingdom: Animalia
- Phylum: Arthropoda
- Clade: Pancrustacea
- Class: Insecta
- Order: Coleoptera
- Suborder: Polyphaga
- Infraorder: Scarabaeiformia
- Family: Scarabaeidae
- Genus: Sparrmannia
- Species: S. acicularis

Binomial name
- Sparrmannia acicularis Evans, 1989

Species of beetle

Sparrmannia acicularis is a species of beetle of the family Scarabaeidae. It is found in Botswana, Namibia and South Africa (Cape).

== Description ==
Adults reach a length of about 14–16.5 mm. The pronotum is covered by long yellowish setae. The elytra are yellowish-brown, with the margins slightly darker than the disc. They are sparsely setose at the basal one-third and there are small, dark setigerous punctures. The disc is weakly puncto-striate. The pygidium is yellowish-brown with scattered, erect white setae.
