= Sparrmannia falcata =

Scientific classification
- Kingdom: Animalia
- Phylum: Arthropoda
- Clade: Pancrustacea
- Class: Insecta
- Order: Coleoptera
- Suborder: Polyphaga
- Infraorder: Scarabaeiformia
- Family: Scarabaeidae
- Genus: Sparrmannia
- Species: S. falcata

Binomial name
- Sparrmannia falcata Evans, 1989

Species of beetle

Sparrmannia falcata is a species of beetle of the family Scarabaeidae. It is found in South Africa (Cape Province).

== Description ==
Adults reach a length of about 14 mm. The pronotum has long yellowish setae. The elytra are yellowish-brown, with the disc weakly puncto-striate. The pygidium is yellowish-brown with scattered setigerous punctures and erect yellowish setae.
