= Psilonychus perturbator =

Scientific classification
- Kingdom: Animalia
- Phylum: Arthropoda
- Clade: Pancrustacea
- Class: Insecta
- Order: Coleoptera
- Suborder: Polyphaga
- Infraorder: Scarabaeiformia
- Family: Scarabaeidae
- Genus: Psilonychus
- Species: P. perturbator

Binomial name
- Psilonychus perturbator Péringuey, 1904

Species of beetle

Psilonychus perturbator is a species of beetle of the family Scarabaeidae. It is found in South Africa (Eastern Cape, KwaZulu-Natal).

== Description ==
Adults reach a length of about 13–13.5 mm (0.51–0.53 in). Males have the same shape, colour and size as Psilonychus gracilis and the white scales on the upper side are of the same size and similarly disposed. However, they differ in the shape of the clypeus, the outer sides of which are not aculeate in the median part, and are thus very much less hexagonal. The shape of the antennal joints is also different and the median depression of the pronotum is not deep, the two smooth walls are more in the shape of two parallel median patches, and the supra-lateral and supra-basal ones are often indistinct. The scutellum is impunctate, but with a slight median impression at the base.
