= Glyptoglossa namaquensis =

Scientific classification
- Kingdom: Animalia
- Phylum: Arthropoda
- Clade: Pancrustacea
- Class: Insecta
- Order: Coleoptera
- Suborder: Polyphaga
- Infraorder: Scarabaeiformia
- Family: Scarabaeidae
- Genus: Glyptoglossa
- Species: G. namaquensis

Binomial name
- Glyptoglossa namaquensis Péringuey, 1904

Species of beetle

Glyptoglossa namaquensis is a species of beetle of the family Scarabaeidae. It is found in South Africa (Northern Cape).

== Description ==
Adults reach a length of about 19 mm (0.75 in). They have the same shape and size as Glyptoglossa dispar, but can be easily distinguished by the shorter tarsi, the joints of which are much broader and also thicker. The colour is brick-red and shining and the pronotum has only a fringe of flavescent distant hairs along the anterior and lateral parts, and a dense one along the base. The punctures on the glabrous pronotum are fine and not closely set, and the nearly impunctate scutellum is very hairy, while the punctures on the elytra are fine and somewhat closely set. The propygidium, pygidium, abdomen, and pectus are as in Glyptoglossa dispar.
