= Scapanoclypeus cornutus =

Scientific classification
- Kingdom: Animalia
- Phylum: Arthropoda
- Clade: Pancrustacea
- Class: Insecta
- Order: Coleoptera
- Suborder: Polyphaga
- Infraorder: Scarabaeiformia
- Family: Scarabaeidae
- Genus: Scapanoclypeus
- Species: S. cornutus

Binomial name
- Scapanoclypeus cornutus Evans, 1987

Species of beetle

Scapanoclypeus cornutus is a species of beetle of the family Scarabaeidae. It is found in Namibia.

== Description ==
Adults reach a length of about 9–12 mm. The clypeus is castaneous and setigerously punctate, while the frons and vertex are piceous. The pronotum is castaneous and the elytra are fulvous.
