= Gymnoschiza variolosipes =

Scientific classification
- Kingdom: Animalia
- Phylum: Arthropoda
- Clade: Pancrustacea
- Class: Insecta
- Order: Coleoptera
- Suborder: Polyphaga
- Infraorder: Scarabaeiformia
- Family: Scarabaeidae
- Genus: Gymnoschiza
- Species: G. variolosipes

Binomial name
- Gymnoschiza variolosipes Moser, 1914

Species of beetle

Gymnoschiza variolosipes is a species of beetle of the family Scarabaeidae. It is found in Gabon.

== Description ==
Adults reach a length of about 15 mm (0.59 in). They are similar to Gymnoschiza gracilipes. They are blackish-brown. The head is densely covered with large punctures, the clypeus keel is flatly curved forward, the anterior margin of the clypeus is arcuately emarginate. The antennae are brown. The pronotum is of a similar shape to that of gracilipes, but the punctures on it are larger. The scutellum is punctate except for a weakly indicated midline. On the elytra, the punctures are stronger than in gracilipes, and while the pygidium of the latter species is only very sparsely punctate, here it is covered with a coarse, reticulate punctation. The underside is moderately densely punctured in the middle, more closely punctured at the sides. The legs, with the exception of the middle of the hind femora, are strongly punctured and bear a row of erect setae on both the posterior and anterior margins of the mid and hind femora.
