= Rhabdopholis =

Scientific classification
- Kingdom: Animalia
- Phylum: Arthropoda
- Clade: Pancrustacea
- Class: Insecta
- Order: Coleoptera
- Suborder: Polyphaga
- Infraorder: Scarabaeiformia
- Family: Scarabaeidae
- Subfamily: Melolonthinae
- Tribe: Leucopholini
- Genus: Rhabdopholis; Burmeister, 1855

Synonyms
- Haplobrachium Boheman, 1857

Genus of leaf beetles

Rhabdopholis, also known as the pyjama beetles, is a genus of scarab beetles (family Scarabaeidae) in tribe Leucopholini of subfamily Melolonthinae.

== Species ==
- Rhabdopholis albostriata Burmeister, 1855
- Rhabdopholis costipennis (Boheman, 1857)
- Rhabdopholis irrorata Péringuey, 1896
- Rhabdopholis margaretae Harrison, 2004
- Rhabdopholis robertsi Harrison, 2004

Members of genus Stephanopholis were formerly often placed here, but they actually belong to the closely related tribe Schizonychini.
