= Sparrmannia namibia =

Scientific classification
- Kingdom: Animalia
- Phylum: Arthropoda
- Clade: Pancrustacea
- Class: Insecta
- Order: Coleoptera
- Suborder: Polyphaga
- Infraorder: Scarabaeiformia
- Family: Scarabaeidae
- Genus: Sparrmannia
- Species: S. namibia

Binomial name
- Sparrmannia namibia Evans, 1989

Species of beetle

Sparrmannia namibia is a species of beetle of the family Scarabaeidae. It is found in Namibia.

== Description ==
Adults reach a length of about 16–19 mm. The pronotum has long yellowish setae. The elytra are pale yellowish-brown, with the surface shallowly, irregularly punctate. The pygidium is brownish, with a smooth surface, and with scattered setigerous punctures, as well as long, yellowish, erect setae.
