= Glyptoglossa capensis =

Scientific classification
- Kingdom: Animalia
- Phylum: Arthropoda
- Clade: Pancrustacea
- Class: Insecta
- Order: Coleoptera
- Suborder: Polyphaga
- Infraorder: Scarabaeiformia
- Family: Scarabaeidae
- Genus: Glyptoglossa
- Species: G. capensis

Binomial name
- Glyptoglossa capensis Evans, 1988

Species of beetle

Glyptoglossa capensis is a species of beetle of the family Scarabaeidae. It is found in South Africa (Northern Cape).

== Description ==
Adults reach a length of about 17–19 mm (0.67–0.75 in). They are testaceous to dark testaceous, with the clypeus deeply punctate and the pronotum with setigerous punctures along the anterior and posterior margins, while the remainder is glabrous. The basal area of the elytra has scattered setae, while the rest is punctate and glabrous. The pygidium is also glabrous.
