= Crepischiza sinuaticeps =

Scientific classification
- Kingdom: Animalia
- Phylum: Arthropoda
- Clade: Pancrustacea
- Class: Insecta
- Order: Coleoptera
- Suborder: Polyphaga
- Infraorder: Scarabaeiformia
- Family: Scarabaeidae
- Genus: Crepischiza
- Species: C. sinuaticeps

Binomial name
- Crepischiza sinuaticeps Moser, 1914

Species of beetle

Crepischiza sinuaticeps is a species of beetle of the family Scarabaeidae. It is found in Tanzania.

== Description ==
Adults reach a length of about 13 mm (0.51 in). They are similar to Crepischiza ertli and almost identical in shape and colouration. The head is similarly sculpted, the frons is flatter, the anterior margin of the clypeus is more deeply emarginate across its entire width. The pronotum is similar in shape to that of ertli, but much more widely punctate. The center of the scutellum is smooth. The punctures on the elytra are also more widely spaced than in ertli. The pygidium is weakly wrinkled, and the large punctures on it bear elongate scales. On the underside, the sides of the thorax and abdomen, the episterna, and the hind coxae are less densely punctate than in ertli.
