= Anartioschiza gabonica =

Scientific classification
- Kingdom: Animalia
- Phylum: Arthropoda
- Clade: Pancrustacea
- Class: Insecta
- Order: Coleoptera
- Suborder: Polyphaga
- Infraorder: Scarabaeiformia
- Family: Scarabaeidae
- Genus: Anartioschiza
- Species: A. gabonica

Binomial name
- Anartioschiza gabonica (Moser, 1917)

Synonyms
- Schizonycha gabonica Thomson, 1858; Anartioschiza gabonica Moser, 1917

Species of beetle

Anartioschiza gabonica is a species of beetle of the family Scarabaeidae. It is found in Gabon and Cameroon.

== Description ==
Adults reach a length of about 15 mm (0.59 in). They are similar to Anartioschiza diversa. They are reddish-brown and shiny. The head is moderately densely covered with punctures, which reveal tiny setae under magnification. The clypeus does not taper anteriorly, the anterior angles are rounded, and the anterior margin is slightly indented. The antennae are brown. The pronotum is twice as wide as it is long, strongly arched in the middle. The lateral margins are very weakly notched and ciliate, and slightly indented behind the anterior angles. The anterior angles are acute, and the posterior angles are very obtuse. The surface is quite densely punctured, and the punctures bear tiny setae. The scutellum is punctate except in the middle. The elytra are slightly wrinkled and moderately densely covered with punctures, which bear very small setae. The pygidium is more densely punctured anteriorly than posteriorly and the punctures bear small scales that become narrower towards the posterior margin.
