= Sparrmannia obscura =

Scientific classification
- Kingdom: Animalia
- Phylum: Arthropoda
- Clade: Pancrustacea
- Class: Insecta
- Order: Coleoptera
- Suborder: Polyphaga
- Infraorder: Scarabaeiformia
- Family: Scarabaeidae
- Genus: Sparrmannia
- Species: S. obscura

Binomial name
- Sparrmannia obscura Evans, 1989

Species of beetle

Sparrmannia obscura is a species of beetle of the family Scarabaeidae. It is found in South Africa (Transvaal, KwaZulu-Natal).

== Description ==
Adults reach a length of about 15–21 mm. The pronotum has long yellowish setae. The elytra are dark yellowish-brown to pale reddish-brown, with the surface deeply, irregularly punctate. The pygidium is yellowish-brown, with scattered setigerous punctures, as well as long, yellowish, erect setae.
