= Rhabdopholis costipennis =

Scientific classification
- Kingdom: Animalia
- Phylum: Arthropoda
- Clade: Pancrustacea
- Class: Insecta
- Order: Coleoptera
- Suborder: Polyphaga
- Infraorder: Scarabaeiformia
- Family: Scarabaeidae
- Genus: Rhabdopholis
- Species: R. costipennis

Binomial name
- Rhabdopholis costipennis (Boheman, 1857)

Synonyms
- Haplobrachium costipenne Boheman, 1857

Species of beetle

Rhabdopholis costipennis is a species of beetle of the family Scarabaeidae. It is found in South Africa (KwaZulu-Natal, Eastern Cape) and Mozambique.

== Description ==
Adults reach a length of about 21–26 mm (0.83–1.02 in) for males and 21–26 mm (0.83–1.02 in) for females. Males are dark brown to black, with white to off-white fine scales covering the head, thorax, elytra, abdominal sternites and legs. Females appear whiter due to larger white scales covering the body. The pro-, meso- and metasternum are covered by dense fine setae.
