= Sparrmannia boschimana =

Scientific classification
- Kingdom: Animalia
- Phylum: Arthropoda
- Class: Insecta
- Order: Coleoptera
- Suborder: Polyphaga
- Infraorder: Scarabaeiformia
- Family: Scarabaeidae
- Genus: Sparrmannia
- Species: S. boschimana

Binomial name
- Sparrmannia boschimana Péringuey, 1904

Species of beetle

Sparrmannia boschimana is a species of beetle of the family Scarabaeidae. It is found in Namibia and South Africa (Northern Cape).

== Description ==
Adults reach a length of about 16–19 mm. The pronotum has long yellowish setae. The elytra are yellowish-brown. The pygidium is yellowish-brown, with scattered setigerous punctures and yellowish, erect setae.
