= Canuschiza hagher =

Scientific classification
- Kingdom: Animalia
- Phylum: Arthropoda
- Clade: Pancrustacea
- Class: Insecta
- Order: Coleoptera
- Suborder: Polyphaga
- Infraorder: Scarabaeiformia
- Family: Scarabaeidae
- Genus: Canuschiza
- Species: C. hagher

Binomial name
- Canuschiza hagher Sehnal, Král & Bezděk, 2014

Species of beetle

Canuschiza hagher is a species of beetle of the family Scarabaeidae. It is found in Yemen (Socotra).

== Description ==
Adults reach a length of about 16.3–17 mm (0.64–0.67 in). They have an elongate, almost parallel, weakly convex body. The dorsal and ventral surfaces are moderately shiny. They are blackish with tiny pale hairs and with the extremities dark brownish to blackish.

== Etymology ==
The species name is derived from the area of origin of the species, the Hagher mountains, Socotra.
