= Hecistopsilus =

Scientific classification
- Kingdom: Animalia
- Phylum: Arthropoda
- Clade: Pancrustacea
- Class: Insecta
- Order: Coleoptera
- Suborder: Polyphaga
- Infraorder: Scarabaeiformia
- Family: Scarabaeidae
- Subfamily: Melolonthinae
- Tribe: Schizonychini
- Genus: Hecistopsilus; Kolbe, 1894

Genus of leaf beetles

Hecistopsilus is a genus of beetles belonging to the family Scarabaeidae.

== Species ==
- Hecistopsilus molitor Kolbe, 1894
- Hecistopsilus setososquamea (Fairmaire, 1887)
- Hecistopsilus sinuatus Kolbe, 1894
