= Entypophana lujai =

Scientific classification
- Kingdom: Animalia
- Phylum: Arthropoda
- Clade: Pancrustacea
- Class: Insecta
- Order: Coleoptera
- Suborder: Polyphaga
- Infraorder: Scarabaeiformia
- Family: Scarabaeidae
- Genus: Entypophana
- Species: E. lujai

Binomial name
- Entypophana lujai Moser, 1917

Species of beetle

Entypophana lujai is a species of beetle of the family Scarabaeidae. It is found in the Democratic Republic of the Congo.

== Description ==
Adults reach a length of about 20 mm. They are reddish-brown and shiny. The head is densely punctate. The lateral margins of the pronotum are slightly notched and the surface is sparsely punctate posteriorly, and closely punctate anteriorly. These punctures are distinctly setate. The elytra and pygidium have a rather dense punctation. The punctures on the elytra with small setae, while the punctures on the pygidium are covered with erect setae.
