= Canuschiza adah =

Scientific classification
- Kingdom: Animalia
- Phylum: Arthropoda
- Clade: Pancrustacea
- Class: Insecta
- Order: Coleoptera
- Suborder: Polyphaga
- Infraorder: Scarabaeiformia
- Family: Scarabaeidae
- Genus: Canuschiza
- Species: C. adah

Binomial name
- Canuschiza adah Sehnal, Král & Bezděk, 2014

Species of beetle

Canuschiza adah is a species of beetle of the family Scarabaeidae. It is found in Yemen (Socotra).

== Description ==
Adults reach a length of about 11.6–13.7 mm (0.46–0.54 in) for males and 13–13.5 mm (0.51–0.53 in) for females. They have an elongate, almost parallel, weakly convex body. The dorsal and ventral surfaces are moderately shiny. They are chestnut brown, with tiny pale hairs.

== Etymology ==
The species name is derived from the area of origin, the Adah wadi, Socotra Island.
