= Coelogenia =

Scientific classification
- Kingdom: Animalia
- Phylum: Arthropoda
- Clade: Pancrustacea
- Class: Insecta
- Order: Coleoptera
- Suborder: Polyphaga
- Infraorder: Scarabaeiformia
- Family: Scarabaeidae
- Subfamily: Melolonthinae
- Tribe: Schizonychini
- Genus: Coelogenia; Moser, 1913

Genus of leaf beetles

Coelogenia is a genus of beetles belonging to the family Scarabaeidae.

== Species ==
- Coelogenia flavida Moser, 1913
- Coelogenia longipes Decelle, 1979
