= Anartioschiza drescheri =

Scientific classification
- Kingdom: Animalia
- Phylum: Arthropoda
- Clade: Pancrustacea
- Class: Insecta
- Order: Coleoptera
- Suborder: Polyphaga
- Infraorder: Scarabaeiformia
- Family: Scarabaeidae
- Genus: Anartioschiza
- Species: A. drescheri

Binomial name
- Anartioschiza drescheri Moser, 1913

Species of beetle

Anartioschiza drescheri is a species of beetle of the family Scarabaeidae. It is found in Indonesia (Java).

== Description ==
Adults reach a length of about 19 mm (0.75 in). They are reddish-brown, with the elytra lighter. In the shape and sculpture of the head, the species completely agrees with Anartioschiza camaruna, but the pronotum is slightly longer, but also densely punctate, with the scales even smaller than in cameruna. The elytra, like the latter species, lack a rib next to the lateral margins. They are weakly wrinkled, and, like in cameruna, moderately densely punctate, but the scales of the punctures are so small that they are hardly visible without a magnifying glass. The scales of the pygidium are broadly oval at the base and become narrower towards the posterior margin. The episterna, as well as the thorax, except for the middle, are densely covered with white scales. The thorax also bears a thin yellow pubescence. The abdomen is covered in scales, but the scales are not as densely packed as in cameruna. The shape of the body is very different, both elliptical and lanceolate.
