= Sparrmannia similis =

Scientific classification
- Kingdom: Animalia
- Phylum: Arthropoda
- Class: Insecta
- Order: Coleoptera
- Suborder: Polyphaga
- Infraorder: Scarabaeiformia
- Family: Scarabaeidae
- Genus: Sparrmannia
- Species: S. similis

Binomial name
- Sparrmannia similis Arrow, 1917

Species of beetle

Sparrmannia similis is a species of beetle of the family Scarabaeidae. It is found in Namibia.

== Description ==
Adults reach a length of about 17–25.5 mm. The pronotum has long yellowish setae. The elytra are dark yellowish-brown to brown, often with the margins slightly darker than the disc. The base has short dense, whitish setae and scattered longer setae along the suture, while the remaining surface is irregularly punctate, glabrous and shining. The pygidium is dark yellowish-brown, with the surface smooth. It is densely, setigerously punctate, and has long, white, erect setae.
