= Scapanoclypeus =

Scientific classification
- Kingdom: Animalia
- Phylum: Arthropoda
- Class: Insecta
- Order: Coleoptera
- Suborder: Polyphaga
- Infraorder: Scarabaeiformia
- Family: Scarabaeidae
- Subfamily: Melolonthinae
- Tribe: Tanyproctini
- Genus: Scapanoclypeus; Evans, 1987

Genus of leaf beetles

Scapanoclypeus is a genus of beetles belonging to the family Scarabaeidae.

== Species ==
- Scapanoclypeus aberrans (Frey, 1974)
- Scapanoclypeus aulacocoleatus Evans, 1987
- Scapanoclypeus bicoloratus Sehnal, 2017
- Scapanoclypeus brunneus Evans, 1987
- Scapanoclypeus carinatus Evans, 1987
- Scapanoclypeus cornutus Evans, 1987
- Scapanoclypeus hardap Sehnal, 2014
- Scapanoclypeus sinepunctatus Sehnal, 2013
- Scapanoclypeus testaceus Evans, 1987
- Scapanoclypeus triapicalis Sehnal, 2013
