= Canuschiza minuta =

Scientific classification
- Kingdom: Animalia
- Phylum: Arthropoda
- Clade: Pancrustacea
- Class: Insecta
- Order: Coleoptera
- Suborder: Polyphaga
- Infraorder: Scarabaeiformia
- Family: Scarabaeidae
- Genus: Canuschiza
- Species: C. minuta

Binomial name
- Canuschiza minuta Lacroix, 1999

Species of beetle

Canuschiza minuta is a species of beetle of the family Scarabaeidae. It is found in Yemen (Socotra).

== Description ==
Adults reach a length of about 6.5–7.5 mm (0.26–0.30 in) for males and 6.8–8.5 mm (0.27–0.33 in) for females. They have an elongate, almost parallel, very convex body. The dorsal and ventral surfaces are moderately shiny. They are chestnut brown with tiny pale hairs.
