= Sparrmannia prieska =

Scientific classification
- Kingdom: Animalia
- Phylum: Arthropoda
- Class: Insecta
- Order: Coleoptera
- Suborder: Polyphaga
- Infraorder: Scarabaeiformia
- Family: Scarabaeidae
- Genus: Sparrmannia
- Species: S. prieska

Binomial name
- Sparrmannia prieska Péringuey, 1904

Species of beetle

Sparrmannia prieska is a species of beetle of the family Scarabaeidae. It is found in South Africa (Northern Cape, Free State).

== Description ==
Adults reach a length of about 12–13 mm. The pronotum is covered by long yellowish setae. The elytra are yellowish-brown with darkened margins. The disc is coarsely and irregularly punctured. The pygidium is yellowish-brown with scattered setigerous punctures and sub-erect yellowish setae.
