= Rhabdopholis irrorata =

Scientific classification
- Kingdom: Animalia
- Phylum: Arthropoda
- Clade: Pancrustacea
- Class: Insecta
- Order: Coleoptera
- Suborder: Polyphaga
- Infraorder: Scarabaeiformia
- Family: Scarabaeidae
- Genus: Rhabdopholis
- Species: R. irrorata

Binomial name
- Rhabdopholis irrorata Péringuey, 1896

Species of beetle

Rhabdopholis irrorata is a species of beetle of the family Scarabaeidae. It is found in South Africa (Mpumalanga, Limpopo).

== Description ==
Adults reach a length of about 13–16 mm (0.51–0.63 in). They are dark brown to black, with white to off-white scales covering the head, thorax, elytra, abdominal sternites and legs. The pro-, meso-, and metasternum are covered by dense fine setae.

== Taxonomy ==
In his revision of the genus Rhabdopholis, Harrison states that this species does not belong in the genus, but cannot be placed in any currently known Melolonthine genus. It should probably be placed in a new monotypic genus, but further research is needed. Hence, it is maintained in Rhabdopholis as a species incertae sedis.
