= Canuschiza skand =

Scientific classification
- Kingdom: Animalia
- Phylum: Arthropoda
- Clade: Pancrustacea
- Class: Insecta
- Order: Coleoptera
- Suborder: Polyphaga
- Infraorder: Scarabaeiformia
- Family: Scarabaeidae
- Genus: Canuschiza
- Species: C. skand

Binomial name
- Canuschiza skand Sehnal, Král & Bezděk, 2014

Species of beetle

Canuschiza skand is a species of beetle of the family Scarabaeidae. It is found in Yemen (Socotra).

== Description ==
Adults reach a length of about 12.2–14.7 mm (0.48–0.58 in) for males and 11.7–14.2 mm (0.46–0.56 in) for females. They have an elongate, almost parallel, weakly convex body. The dorsal and ventral surfaces are moderately shiny. They are chestnut brown with tiny pale hairs.

== Etymology ==
The species name is derived from the area of origin, the vicinity of the Skand mountain, Socotra.
