= Anartioschiza setosa =

Scientific classification
- Kingdom: Animalia
- Phylum: Arthropoda
- Clade: Pancrustacea
- Class: Insecta
- Order: Coleoptera
- Suborder: Polyphaga
- Infraorder: Scarabaeiformia
- Family: Scarabaeidae
- Genus: Anartioschiza
- Species: A. setosa

Binomial name
- Anartioschiza setosa Moser, 1913

Species of beetle

Anartioschiza setosa is a species of beetle of the family Scarabaeidae. It is found in the Central African Republic, Cameroon and Togo.

== Description ==
Adults reach a length of about 14 mm (0.55 in). The upper surface is quite densely punctured, with yellowish setae on the punctures. The pronotum bears both shorter and longer, erect setae. The thorax is covered with yellowish hairs, but between these hairs are scattered white, spike-like scales. The abdomen is covered with robust scales.
