= Scapanoclypeus hardap =

Scientific classification
- Kingdom: Animalia
- Phylum: Arthropoda
- Class: Insecta
- Order: Coleoptera
- Suborder: Polyphaga
- Infraorder: Scarabaeiformia
- Family: Scarabaeidae
- Genus: Scapanoclypeus
- Species: S. hardap

Binomial name
- Scapanoclypeus hardap Sehnal, 2014

Species of beetle

Scapanoclypeus hardap is a species of beetle of the family Scarabaeidae. It is found in Namibia.

== Description ==
Adults reach a length of about 8.2–9.7 mm. They have a long, elongate body. The head is dark blackish brown with a brown clypeal margin. The pronotum is brownish-yellow with a darker disc and vague brownish black spots laterally. The elytra are yellowish-brown with brownish-black margins and darker suture. The dorsum, abdomen and antennae are yellowish-brown.

== Etymology ==
The species name refers to the Hardap province (Namibia), where the species is found.
