= Entypophana =

Scientific classification
- Kingdom: Animalia
- Phylum: Arthropoda
- Clade: Pancrustacea
- Class: Insecta
- Order: Coleoptera
- Suborder: Polyphaga
- Infraorder: Scarabaeiformia
- Family: Scarabaeidae
- Subfamily: Melolonthinae
- Tribe: Schizonychini
- Genus: Entypophana; Moser, 1913

Genus of leaf beetles

Entypophana is a genus of beetles belonging to the family Scarabaeidae.

== Species ==
- Entypophana apicata Moser, 1913
- Entypophana biapicata Moser, 1913
- Entypophana hulstaerti Burgeon, 1946
- Entypophana lujai Moser, 1917
- Entypophana maynei Burgeon, 1946
- Entypophana njiapanda Sehnal, 2017
