= Sparrmannia flavofasciata =

Scientific classification
- Kingdom: Animalia
- Phylum: Arthropoda
- Class: Insecta
- Order: Coleoptera
- Suborder: Polyphaga
- Infraorder: Scarabaeiformia
- Family: Scarabaeidae
- Genus: Sparrmannia
- Species: S. flavofasciata

Binomial name
- Sparrmannia flavofasciata (Burmeister, 1855)

Synonyms
- Leontochaeta flavofasciata Burmeister, 1855; Cephalotrichia bifasciata Hope, 1837

Species of beetle

Sparrmannia flavofasciata is a species of beetle of the family Scarabaeidae. It is found in South Africa (Lesotho, Free State, Eastern Cape).

== Description ==
Adults reach a length of about 16–18 mm. They have a black head and pronotum. The latter is densely pilose. The elytra are black at the basal and apical one-third, with a medially transverse yellowish-brown band. The suture is black.
