= Coelogenia flavida =

Scientific classification
- Kingdom: Animalia
- Phylum: Arthropoda
- Clade: Pancrustacea
- Class: Insecta
- Order: Coleoptera
- Suborder: Polyphaga
- Infraorder: Scarabaeiformia
- Family: Scarabaeidae
- Genus: Coelogenia
- Species: C. flavida

Binomial name
- Coelogenia flavida Moser, 1913

Species of beetle

Coelogenia flavida is a species of beetle of the family Scarabaeidae. It is found in Kenya and Tanzania.

== Description ==
Adults reach a length of about 19–21 mm (0.75–0.83 in). They are yellowish-brown and glossy, with the head reddish-brown, the latter coarsely punctured. Apart from the stronger punctation, the upper and lower surfaces show extremely fine and very dense punctation. On the pronotum, the coarser punctures are widely spaced in the middle, more densely packed at the sides, and are very short-set. The scutellum shows only a few punctures beside the lateral margins. The punctures on the elytra are quite narrowly spaced and bear barely visible setae.
