= Canuschiza dracaena =

Scientific classification
- Kingdom: Animalia
- Phylum: Arthropoda
- Clade: Pancrustacea
- Class: Insecta
- Order: Coleoptera
- Suborder: Polyphaga
- Infraorder: Scarabaeiformia
- Family: Scarabaeidae
- Genus: Canuschiza
- Species: C. dracaena

Binomial name
- Canuschiza dracaena Sehnal, Král & Bezděk, 2014

Species of beetle

Canuschiza dracaena is a species of beetle of the family Scarabaeidae. It is found in Yemen (Socotra).

== Description ==
Adults reach a length of about 12.9–16.4 mm (0.51–0.65 in) for males and 13.2–17.2 mm (0.52–0.68 in) for females. They have an elongate, almost parallel, weakly convex body. The dorsal and ventral surfaces are moderately shiny. They are chestnut brown with tiny pale hairs.

== Etymology ==
The species name is derived from the Latin name of Dracaena cinnabari, a tree endemic to Socotra.
