= Lepidotrogus =

Scientific classification
- Kingdom: Animalia
- Phylum: Arthropoda
- Clade: Pancrustacea
- Class: Insecta
- Order: Coleoptera
- Suborder: Polyphaga
- Infraorder: Scarabaeiformia
- Family: Scarabaeidae
- Subfamily: Melolonthinae
- Tribe: Schizonychini
- Genus: Lepidotrogus; Kolbe, 1894

Genus of leaf beetles

Lepidotrogus is a genus of beetles belonging to the family Scarabaeidae.

== Species ==
- Lepidotrogus conradti Kolbe, 1894
- Lepidotrogus fulvipennis Moser, 1913
- Lepidotrogus kilimanus Moser, 1913
- Lepidotrogus nyassicus Moser, 1913
- Lepidotrogus signaticollis Moser, 1913
- Lepidotrogus squamiger Kolbe, 1894
