= Entypophana njiapanda =

Scientific classification
- Kingdom: Animalia
- Phylum: Arthropoda
- Clade: Pancrustacea
- Class: Insecta
- Order: Coleoptera
- Suborder: Polyphaga
- Infraorder: Scarabaeiformia
- Family: Scarabaeidae
- Genus: Entypophana
- Species: E. njiapanda

Binomial name
- Entypophana njiapanda Sehnal, 2017

Species of beetle

Entypophana njiapanda is a species of beetle of the family Scarabaeidae. It is found in Tanzania.

== Description ==
Adults reach a length of about 17.9–20 mm (0.70–0.79 in). They have an elongate, almost parallel-sided, strongly convex body. The dorsal and ventral surfaces are weakly shiny with tiny pale hairs. The head and pronotum are dark brown and the elytra are brown.

== Etymology ==
The species name is derived from name of the type locality, Njia Panda, Tanzania.
