= Anartioschiza squamosetosa =

Scientific classification
- Kingdom: Animalia
- Phylum: Arthropoda
- Clade: Pancrustacea
- Class: Insecta
- Order: Coleoptera
- Suborder: Polyphaga
- Infraorder: Scarabaeiformia
- Family: Scarabaeidae
- Genus: Anartioschiza
- Species: A. squamosetosa

Binomial name
- Anartioschiza squamosetosa Moser, 1913

Species of beetle

Anartioschiza squamosetosa is a species of beetle of the family Scarabaeidae. It is found in Cameroon, the Central African Republic, Gabon, the Democratic Republic of the Congo and Equatorial Guinea.

== Description ==
Adults reach a length of about 22 mm (0.87 in). They are similar to Anartioschiza major, but are immediately distinguishable by the fact that the punctures on the upper surface bear larger, bristle-like scales. The head is moderately densely punctured, the frons only sparsely punctured, and the anterior margin of the clypeus is weakly emarginate. The pronotum is more than twice as wide as it is long, the obtuse hind angles are rounded, and the anterior angles are right-angled. The punctures are rather sparse in the middle and narrower at the sides. Like major, the elytra show an indistinct rib beside the lateral margin. The punctures are rather dense, and the lateral margins are covered with erect setae. The pygidium is more sparsely punctured towards the posterior margin, and the scales are oblong-ovate, almost elliptical. The thorax is densely covered with large scales.
