= Sparrmannia distincta =

Scientific classification
- Kingdom: Animalia
- Phylum: Arthropoda
- Class: Insecta
- Order: Coleoptera
- Suborder: Polyphaga
- Infraorder: Scarabaeiformia
- Family: Scarabaeidae
- Genus: Sparrmannia
- Species: S. distincta

Binomial name
- Sparrmannia distincta Péringuey, 1888

Species of beetle

Sparrmannia distincta is a species of beetle of the family Scarabaeidae. It is found in South Africa (Mpumalanga, Gauteng, North West, Free State, Limpopo).

== Description ==
Adults reach a length of about 14–18.5 mm. The pronotum has long yellowish setae. The elytra are dark yellowish-brown to reddish-brown, with the surface deeply, irregularly punctate. The pygidium is reddish-brown, with scattered setigerous punctures and long, yellowish, erect setae.
