= Lepischiza =

Scientific classification
- Kingdom: Animalia
- Phylum: Arthropoda
- Clade: Pancrustacea
- Class: Insecta
- Order: Coleoptera
- Suborder: Polyphaga
- Infraorder: Scarabaeiformia
- Family: Scarabaeidae
- Subfamily: Melolonthinae
- Tribe: Schizonychini
- Genus: Lepischiza; Moser, 1914
- Species: L. vestita

Binomial name
- Lepischiza vestita Moser, 1914

Genus of beetles

Lepischiza is a genus of beetle of the family Scarabaeidae. It is monotypic, being represented by the single species, Lepischiza vestita, which is found in Tanzania.

== Description ==
Adults reach a length of about 16–18 mm (0.63–0.71 in). The head is densely punctate, the punctures are bristled, and the anterior margin of the clypeus is not emarginate. The pronotum is very densely punctate and the scales are narrow, almost bristle-like. The punctation on the elytra is moderately dense. The scales of the punctures are narrow and pointed. On the pygidium, the bristled umbilical punctures are quite closely spaced. The underside is densely punctate everywhere, and the punctures are bristled. The bristles are more or less scale-like. Only on the middle of the thorax are they yellow and more hair-like. On the sides of the abdomen, there are also a few longer yellow setae.
