= Sparrmannia capicola =

Scientific classification
- Kingdom: Animalia
- Phylum: Arthropoda
- Class: Insecta
- Order: Coleoptera
- Suborder: Polyphaga
- Infraorder: Scarabaeiformia
- Family: Scarabaeidae
- Genus: Sparrmannia
- Species: S. capicola

Binomial name
- Sparrmannia capicola Péringuey, 1904

Synonyms
- Cephalotrichia crinicollis Hope, 1837

Species of beetle

Sparrmannia capicola is a species of beetle of the family Scarabaeidae. It is found in South Africa (Western Cape).

== Description ==
Adults reach a length of about 17.5–18 mm. The pronotum has long yellowish setae. The elytra are dark yellowish-brown, with the disc deeply punctate, somewhat puncto-striate with four impunctate interstriae between the sutural and lateral margins. The pygidium is brownish, with the surface smooth, and with scattered setigerous punctures and pale, erect setae.
