= Glyptoglossa burmeisteri =

Scientific classification
- Kingdom: Animalia
- Phylum: Arthropoda
- Clade: Pancrustacea
- Class: Insecta
- Order: Coleoptera
- Suborder: Polyphaga
- Infraorder: Scarabaeiformia
- Family: Scarabaeidae
- Genus: Glyptoglossa
- Species: G. burmeisteri

Binomial name
- Glyptoglossa burmeisteri Brenske, 1898

Species of beetle

Glyptoglossa burmeisteri is a species of beetle of the family Scarabaeidae. It is found in South Africa (Western Cape).

== Description ==
Adults reach a length of about 19 mm (0.75 in). The head and pronotum are light testaceous-red, while the elytra, underside and legs are flavescent. The clypeus is punctate laterally only and the pronotum is covered with round, irregular punctures, separated by smooth also irregular intervals, the anterior and the outer margins have a fringe of somewhat remote longish hairs, and the base has a dense fringe of flavous hairs, but the punctures on the disk are not setigerous. The elytra are without costules or striae with the exception of the sutural stria. The pygidium is punctulate in the central part only from base to the apex and the abdomen is almost glabrous, and has somewhat scattered and shallow punctures.
