= Sparrmannia discrepans =

Scientific classification
- Kingdom: Animalia
- Phylum: Arthropoda
- Class: Insecta
- Order: Coleoptera
- Suborder: Polyphaga
- Infraorder: Scarabaeiformia
- Family: Scarabaeidae
- Genus: Sparrmannia
- Species: S. discrepans

Binomial name
- Sparrmannia discrepans Péringuey, 1904

Species of beetle

Sparrmannia discrepans is a species of beetle of the family Scarabaeidae. It is found in Botswana, Malawi and Zimbabwe.

== Description ==
Adults reach a length of about 16–17 mm. The pronotum has long yellowish setae. The elytra are brown or reddish-brown, with the surface deeply, irregularly punctate. The pygidium is brown or reddish-brown, with scattered setigerous punctures and long, yellowish, erect setae.
