= Gymnoschiza =

Scientific classification
- Kingdom: Animalia
- Phylum: Arthropoda
- Clade: Pancrustacea
- Class: Insecta
- Order: Coleoptera
- Suborder: Polyphaga
- Infraorder: Scarabaeiformia
- Family: Scarabaeidae
- Subfamily: Melolonthinae
- Tribe: Schizonychini
- Genus: Gymnoschiza; Moser, 1914

Genus of leaf beetles

Gymnoschiza is a genus of beetles belonging to the family Scarabaeidae.

== Species ==
- Gymnoschiza gracilipes (Brenske, 1898)
- Gymnoschiza punctatissima (Brenske, 1899)
- Gymnoschiza rufa Decelle, 1973
- Gymnoschiza serrata (Aulmann, 1911)
- Gymnoschiza setiventris Moser, 1917
- Gymnoschiza variolosipes Moser, 1914
