= Canuschiza firmihin =

Scientific classification
- Kingdom: Animalia
- Phylum: Arthropoda
- Clade: Pancrustacea
- Class: Insecta
- Order: Coleoptera
- Suborder: Polyphaga
- Infraorder: Scarabaeiformia
- Family: Scarabaeidae
- Genus: Canuschiza
- Species: C. firmihin

Binomial name
- Canuschiza firmihin Sehnal, Král & Bezděk, 2014

Species of beetle

Canuschiza firmihin is a species of beetle of the family Scarabaeidae. It is found in Yemen (Socotra).

== Description ==
Adults reach a length of about 9–11.3 mm (0.35–0.44 in). They have an elongate, almost parallel, weakly convex body. The dorsal and ventral surfaces are moderately shiny. They are chestnut brown with tiny pale hairs.

== Etymology ==
The species name is derived from the area of origin of the species, the Firmihin plateau, Socotra.
