= Entypophana hulstaerti =

Scientific classification
- Kingdom: Animalia
- Phylum: Arthropoda
- Clade: Pancrustacea
- Class: Insecta
- Order: Coleoptera
- Suborder: Polyphaga
- Infraorder: Scarabaeiformia
- Family: Scarabaeidae
- Genus: Entypophana
- Species: E. hulstaerti

Binomial name
- Entypophana hulstaerti Burgeon, 1946

Species of beetle

Entypophana hulstaerti is a species of beetle of the family Scarabaeidae. It is found in the Democratic Republic of the Congo.

== Description ==
Adults reach a length of about 18.4 mm (0.72 in). They have an elongate, almost parallel-sided, strongly convex body. The dorsal and ventral surfaces are weakly shiny. The elytra are reddish brown, with tiny pale hairs.
