= Canuschiza zerig =

Scientific classification
- Kingdom: Animalia
- Phylum: Arthropoda
- Clade: Pancrustacea
- Class: Insecta
- Order: Coleoptera
- Suborder: Polyphaga
- Infraorder: Scarabaeiformia
- Family: Scarabaeidae
- Genus: Canuschiza
- Species: C. zerig

Binomial name
- Canuschiza zerig Sehnal, Král & Bezděk, 2017

Species of beetle

Canuschiza zerig is a species of beetle of the family Scarabaeidae. It is found in Yemen (Socotra).

== Description ==
Adults reach a length of about 8–10.6 mm (0.31–0.42 in) for males and 8.5–10 mm (0.33–0.39 in) for females. They have an elongate, almost parallel, very convex body. The dorsal and ventral surfaces are moderately shiny. They are light chestnut brown with tiny pale hairs.

== Etymology ==
The species name is derived from the area of origin, Wadi Zerig, Socotra.
