= Sparrmannia fusciventris =

Scientific classification
- Kingdom: Animalia
- Phylum: Arthropoda
- Class: Insecta
- Order: Coleoptera
- Suborder: Polyphaga
- Infraorder: Scarabaeiformia
- Family: Scarabaeidae
- Genus: Sparrmannia
- Species: S. fusciventris

Binomial name
- Sparrmannia fusciventris (Boheman, 1857)

Synonyms
- Leontochaeta fusciventris Boheman, 1857

Species of beetle

Sparrmannia fusciventris is a species of beetle of the family Scarabaeidae. It is found in South Africa (Limpopo).

== Description ==
Adults reach a length of about 14–16 mm. The pronotum has long yellowish setae. The elytra are yellowish-brown, with the margins slightly darker. They are sparsely setose at the basal one-third and there are small, dark setigerous punctures. The disc is irregularly punctate. The pygidium is yellowish-brown with scattered setigerous punctures and erect pale setae.
