= Aulacoschiza =

Scientific classification
- Kingdom: Animalia
- Phylum: Arthropoda
- Clade: Pancrustacea
- Class: Insecta
- Order: Coleoptera
- Suborder: Polyphaga
- Infraorder: Scarabaeiformia
- Family: Scarabaeidae
- Subfamily: Melolonthinae
- Tribe: Schizonychini
- Genus: Aulacoschiza; Decelle, 1973

Genus of leaf beetles

Aulacoschiza is a genus of beetles belonging to the family Scarabaeidae.

== Species ==
- Aulacoschiza epipleuralis Decelle, 1973
- Aulacoschiza hexaphylla (Burgeon, 1948)
- Aulacoschiza triphylla Decelle, 1973
