= Anartioschiza =

Scientific classification
- Kingdom: Animalia
- Phylum: Arthropoda
- Clade: Pancrustacea
- Class: Insecta
- Order: Coleoptera
- Suborder: Polyphaga
- Infraorder: Scarabaeiformia
- Family: Scarabaeidae
- Subfamily: Melolonthinae
- Tribe: Schizonychini
- Genus: Anartioschiza; Kolbe, 1894

Genus of leaf beetles

Anartioschiza is a genus of beetles belonging to the family Scarabaeidae.

== Species ==
- Anartioschiza bambutocola Decelle, 1975
- Anartioschiza calabarica Moser, 1913
- Anartioschiza camaruna Kolbe, 1894
- Anartioschiza collarti Burgeon, 1946
- Anartioschiza diversa Moser, 1913
- Anartioschiza drescheri Moser, 1913
- Anartioschiza gabonica (Thomson, 1858)
- Anartioschiza garambensis Decelle, 1975
- Anartioschiza kivuensis Burgeon, 1946
- Anartioschiza leopoldi Burgeon, 1946
- Anartioschiza major Kolbe, 1894
- Anartioschiza medleri Decelle, 1975
- Anartioschiza persquamosa Burgeon, 1946
- Anartioschiza setosa Moser, 1913
- Anartioschiza setosella Moser, 1913
- Anartioschiza sororia Moser, 1913
- Anartioschiza squamosetosa Moser, 1913
- Anartioschiza tshuapensis Decelle, 1975
