= Wadaia =

Scientific classification
- Kingdom: Animalia
- Phylum: Arthropoda
- Clade: Pancrustacea
- Class: Insecta
- Order: Coleoptera
- Suborder: Polyphaga
- Infraorder: Scarabaeiformia
- Family: Scarabaeidae
- Subfamily: Melolonthinae
- Tribe: Schizonychini
- Genus: Wadaia; Itoh, 1993

Synonyms
- Pahangia Arrow, 1948

Genus of leaf beetles

Wadaia is a genus of beetles belonging to the family Scarabaeidae.

== Species ==
- Wadaia costata (Arrow, 1948)
- Wadaia kaorui Itoh, 1993
