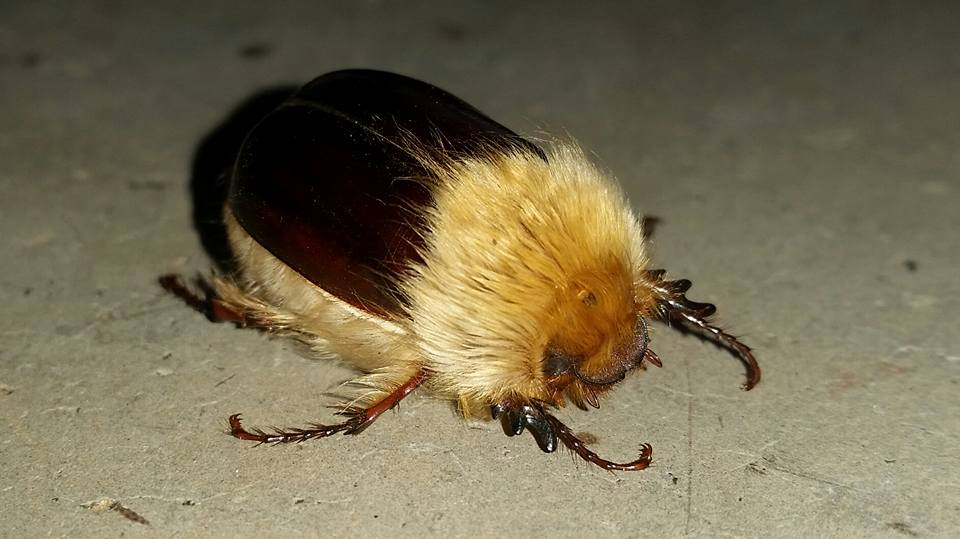

Scientific classification
- Kingdom: Animalia
- Phylum: Arthropoda
- Clade: Pancrustacea
- Class: Insecta
- Order: Coleoptera
- Suborder: Polyphaga
- Infraorder: Scarabaeiformia
- Family: Scarabaeidae
- Tribe: Tanyproctini
- Genus: Sparrmannia; Laporte, 1840

Synonyms
- Leocaeta Dejean 1833 (Nom. Obl.); Lagosterna Dejean 1833 (Nom. Nud.); Cephalotrichia Hope 1837 (Nom. Obl.); Sparmannia Laporte, 1840 (Orig. Missp.); Leontochaeta Erichson, 1847; Sparrmannia Gemminger & Harold, 1869 Emend.

= Sparrmannia (beetle) =

Genus of beetles

Sparrmannia is a genus of scarab beetles belonging to the subfamily Melolonthinae. Though the name was originally spelled as Sparmannia, a subsequent emendation of this spelling is in prevailing usage and therefore conserved under ICZN Article 23.9.1.

== Species ==
- Sparrmannia acicularis Evans, 1989
- Sparrmannia alopex (Fabricius, 1787)
- Sparrmannia angola Evans, 1989
- Sparrmannia bechuana Peringuey, 1904
- Sparrmannia boschimana Peringuey, 1904
- Sparrmannia capicola Peringuey, 1904
- Sparrmannia crinicollis (Burmeister, 1855)
- Sparrmannia dekindti Nonfried, 1906
- Sparrmannia discrepans Peringuey, 1904
- Sparrmannia distincta Peringuey, 1904
- Sparrmannia falcata Evans, 1989
- Sparrmannia flava Arrow, 1917
- Sparrmannia flavofasciata (Burmeister, 1855)
- Sparrmannia fusciventris (Boheman, 1857)
- Sparrmannia gonaqua Peringuey, 1904
- Sparrmannia gorilla Gemminger & Harold, 1869
- Sparrmannia leo (Gyllenhal, 1817)
- Sparrmannia namaqua Peringuey, 1904
- Sparrmannia namibia Evans, 1989
- Sparrmannia obscura Evans, 1989
- Sparrmannia peringueyi Evans, 1989
- Sparrmannia prieska Peringuey, 1904
- Sparrmannia pseudotransvaalica Evans, 1989
- Sparrmannia similis Arrow, 1917
- Sparrmannia transvaalica Peringuey, 1904
- Sparrmannia tridactyla Evans, 1989
- Sparrmannia ursina Evans, 1989
- Sparrmannia vicina Evans, 1989
- Sparrmannia werneri Lacroix, 2004
