= Sparrmannia gonaqua =

Scientific classification
- Kingdom: Animalia
- Phylum: Arthropoda
- Class: Insecta
- Order: Coleoptera
- Suborder: Polyphaga
- Infraorder: Scarabaeiformia
- Family: Scarabaeidae
- Genus: Sparrmannia
- Species: S. gonaqua

Binomial name
- Sparrmannia gonaqua Péringuey, 1904

Species of beetle

Sparrmannia gonaqua is a species of beetle of the family Scarabaeidae. It is found in Namibia and South Africa (Western Cape).

== Description ==
Adults reach a length of about 14–16.5 mm. The pronotum has long yellowish setae. The elytra are yellowish-brown, with the disc shallowly punctate. The pygidium is yellowish-brown, with scattered setigerous punctures, and long, yellowish, sub-erect setae.
