= Anartioschiza setosella =

Scientific classification
- Kingdom: Animalia
- Phylum: Arthropoda
- Clade: Pancrustacea
- Class: Insecta
- Order: Coleoptera
- Suborder: Polyphaga
- Infraorder: Scarabaeiformia
- Family: Scarabaeidae
- Genus: Anartioschiza
- Species: A. setosella

Binomial name
- Anartioschiza setosella Moser, 1913

Species of beetle

Anartioschiza setosella is a species of beetle of the family Scarabaeidae. It is found in Cameroon, Gabon, Ivory Coast, Nigeria, Equatorial Guinea and Sierra Leone.

== Description ==
Adults reach a length of about 20 mm (0.79 in). The upper and lower surfaces are quite densely punctured, and each puncture bears a yellowish bristle. On the head, the punctures are somewhat wrinkled, and the anterior margin of the clypeus is shallowly emarginate. The pronotum is strongly punctured. It is more than twice as wide as it is long, widest in the middle. The posterior angles are obtuse, the anterior angles right-angled. The lateral margins are somewhat upturned and weakly crenate. The punctures of the scutellum and elytra are less coarse, and the lateral margins of the latter bear erect setae. The underside is quite densely punctured everywhere, only slightly more so at the sides than in the middle.
