= Sparrmannia alopex =

Scientific classification
- Kingdom: Animalia
- Phylum: Arthropoda
- Clade: Pancrustacea
- Class: Insecta
- Order: Coleoptera
- Suborder: Polyphaga
- Infraorder: Scarabaeiformia
- Family: Scarabaeidae
- Genus: Sparrmannia
- Species: S. alopex

Binomial name
- Sparrmannia alopex (Fabricius, 1787)

Synonyms
- Melolontha alopex Fabricius, 1787; Melolontha brunnipennis Laporte, 1840; Scarabaeus vertumnus Pallas, 1771

Species of beetle

Sparrmannia alopex is a species of beetle of the family Scarabaeidae. It is found in Namibia and South Africa (Western Cape, Northern Cape, Eastern Cape).

== Description ==
Adults reach a length of about 19.5–26 mm. The pronotum has long yellowish setae. The elytra are brown or reddish-brown, with the surface irregularly punctate, glabrous and opaque. The pygidium is brown or reddish-brown, with the surface smooth, and with scattered setigerous punctures, as well as short, yellowish, erect setae.
