= Crepischiza ertli =

Scientific classification
- Kingdom: Animalia
- Phylum: Arthropoda
- Clade: Pancrustacea
- Class: Insecta
- Order: Coleoptera
- Suborder: Polyphaga
- Infraorder: Scarabaeiformia
- Family: Scarabaeidae
- Genus: Crepischiza
- Species: C. ertli

Binomial name
- Crepischiza ertli Moser, 1914

Species of beetle

Crepischiza ertli is a species of beetle of the family Scarabaeidae. It is found in Tanzania.

== Description ==
Adults reach a length of about 13 mm (0.51 in). They are reddish-brown. The head is widely punctate anteriorly, becoming more densely punctate towards the vertex, with the punctures rather coarse.The frons is twice as long as the clypeus. The upturned anterior margin of the latter is slightly emarginate. The pronotum is of a similar shape to that of Crepischiza usambarae and moderately densely punctate. The punctures are covered with tiny scales perceptible only under a magnifying glass. The scutellum is punctate. The elytra are weakly wrinkled and rather densely punctate and the punctures bear small, whitish, scale-like setae that are somewhat larger than those in usambarae. The pygidium shows close punctation, and the scales of the punctures are ovate or rounded. On the underside, the middle of the thorax is almost smooth, that of the abdomen is widely punctate, and the sides, episterna, and hind coxae are fairly densely punctate.
