= Crepischiza =

Scientific classification
- Kingdom: Animalia
- Phylum: Arthropoda
- Clade: Pancrustacea
- Class: Insecta
- Order: Coleoptera
- Suborder: Polyphaga
- Infraorder: Scarabaeiformia
- Family: Scarabaeidae
- Subfamily: Melolonthinae
- Tribe: Schizonychini
- Genus: Crepischiza; Brenske, 1903

Genus of leaf beetles

Crepischiza is a genus of beetles belonging to the family Scarabaeidae.

== Species ==
- Crepischiza ertli Moser, 1914
- Crepischiza pallida Arrow, 1944
- Crepischiza pruinosa Arrow, 1944
- Crepischiza schoutedeni Moser, 1926
- Crepischiza sinuaticeps Moser, 1914
- Crepischiza usambarae Brenske, 1903
