= Canuschiza jatropha =

Scientific classification
- Kingdom: Animalia
- Phylum: Arthropoda
- Clade: Pancrustacea
- Class: Insecta
- Order: Coleoptera
- Suborder: Polyphaga
- Infraorder: Scarabaeiformia
- Family: Scarabaeidae
- Genus: Canuschiza
- Species: C. jatropha

Binomial name
- Canuschiza jatropha Sehnal, Král & Bezděk, 2014

Species of beetle

Canuschiza jatropha is a species of beetle of the family Scarabaeidae. It is found in Yemen (Socotra).

== Description ==
Adults reach a length of about 12.5–14.8 mm (0.49–0.58 in) for males and 12.7–15.8 mm (0.50–0.62 in) for females. They have an elongate, almost parallel, weakly convex body. The dorsal and ventral surfaces are moderately shiny. They are chestnut brown with tiny pale hairs.

== Etymology ==
The species name is derived from the Latin name of Jatropha unicostata, a plant endemic to Socotra.
