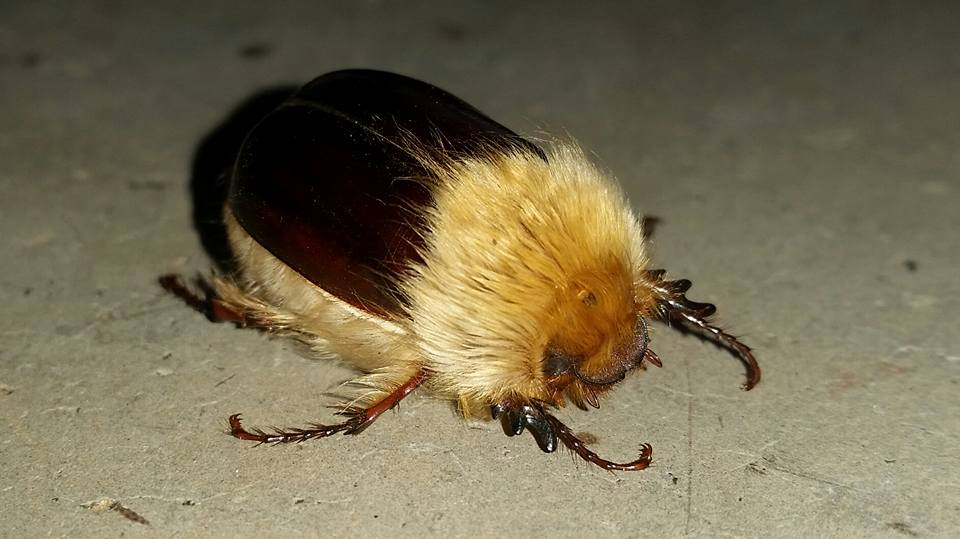

Scientific classification
- Kingdom: Animalia
- Phylum: Arthropoda
- Class: Insecta
- Order: Coleoptera
- Suborder: Polyphaga
- Infraorder: Scarabaeiformia
- Family: Scarabaeidae
- Genus: Sparrmannia
- Species: S. flava

Binomial name
- Sparrmannia flava Arrow, 1917

= Sparrmannia flava =

Species of beetle

Sparrmannia flava is a species of beetle of the family Scarabaeidae. It is found in Namibia, South Africa (Cape, Transvaal, Free State), Zambia and Zimbabwe.

== Description ==
Adults reach a length of about 17–23 mm. The pronotum has long whitish setae. The elytra are yellowish-brown to pale brown, with the base densely pilose and with scattered long, sub-erect setae along the proximal half of the suture. The remaining surface is irregularly punctate, glabrous and shining. The pygidium is yellowish-brown, with the surface smooth, and with scattered setigerous punctures, as well as long and short, whitish, erect setae.
