= Psilonychus eckloni =

Scientific classification
- Kingdom: Animalia
- Phylum: Arthropoda
- Clade: Pancrustacea
- Class: Insecta
- Order: Coleoptera
- Suborder: Polyphaga
- Infraorder: Scarabaeiformia
- Family: Scarabaeidae
- Genus: Psilonychus
- Species: P. eckloni

Binomial name
- Psilonychus eckloni Burmeister, 1855

Species of beetle

Psilonychus eckloni is a species of beetle of the family Scarabaeidae. It is found in South Africa (KwaZulu-Natal).

== Description ==
Adults reach a length of about 13 mm (0.51 in). Males are reddish-bronze, and have the same shape and size as Psilonychus deridens, but with a different vestiture, being clothed on the upper side with elongated, slightly yellowish-white scales, longer and more hair-like on the head and pronotum, and leaving slightly past the median part of the elytra three small, denuded, elongated spots set sub-transversely on each side. The pronotum has no median longitudinal groove, but the supra-lateral elongate patch on each side of the posterior part is very plain. The scutellum is somewhat deeply punctate and the elytra are non-costulate. The propygidium is clothed with very fine, slightly squamiform, appressed hairs, but having a band of scales along the posterior margin. The pygidium, abdomen and legs are clothed with whitish scales. The legs, palpi, and antennae are rufescent-brown.
