= Trichoschiza =

Scientific classification
- Kingdom: Animalia
- Phylum: Arthropoda
- Clade: Pancrustacea
- Class: Insecta
- Order: Coleoptera
- Suborder: Polyphaga
- Infraorder: Scarabaeiformia
- Family: Scarabaeidae
- Subfamily: Melolonthinae
- Tribe: Schizonychini
- Genus: Trichoschiza; Moser, 1917
- Species: T. gracilipes

Binomial name
- Trichoschiza gracilipes Moser, 1917

Genus of beetles

Trichoschiza is a genus of beetle of the family Scarabaeidae. It is monotypic, being represented by the single species, Trichoschiza gracilipes, which is found in Ethiopia.

== Description ==
Adults reach a length of about 10 mm. They are yellowish-brown, while the head, pronotum, scutellum, and legs are reddish-brown. The lateral margins of the pronotum are weakly notched and, like the posterior margin, fringed with yellow hairs. The surface is sparsely and irregularly punctate. Some punctures before the posterior margin are hairy. The scutellum have only scattered punctures. The elytra are transversely wrinkled and moderately densely covered with minute bristle-bearing punctures.
