= Anartioschiza calabarica =

Scientific classification
- Kingdom: Animalia
- Phylum: Arthropoda
- Clade: Pancrustacea
- Class: Insecta
- Order: Coleoptera
- Suborder: Polyphaga
- Infraorder: Scarabaeiformia
- Family: Scarabaeidae
- Genus: Anartioschiza
- Species: A. calabarica

Binomial name
- Anartioschiza calabarica Moser, 1913

Species of beetle

Anartioschiza calabarica is a species of beetle of the family Scarabaeidae. It is found in Nigeria.

== Description ==
Adults reach a length of about 18 mm (0.71 in). The head is robustly punctured (slightly denser laterally than in the middle). The punctures bear short setae, and the slightly curved anterior margin of the clypeus is weakly emarginate. The pronotum is only sparsely punctate, but the punctures are strong and bear yellowish setae. The lateral margins of the pronotum are weakly crenate. On the elytra, the punctures are denser than on the pronotum and bear narrow, pointed, bristle-like scales. The moderately dense punctures of the pygidium bear erect setae.
