= Scapanoclypeus bicoloratus =

Scientific classification
- Kingdom: Animalia
- Phylum: Arthropoda
- Class: Insecta
- Order: Coleoptera
- Suborder: Polyphaga
- Infraorder: Scarabaeiformia
- Family: Scarabaeidae
- Genus: Scapanoclypeus
- Species: S. bicoloratus

Binomial name
- Scapanoclypeus bicoloratus Sehnal, 2017

Species of beetle

Scapanoclypeus bicoloratus is a species of beetle of the family Scarabaeidae. It is found in Namibia.

== Description ==
Adults reach a length of about 6.3–8.2 mm. They have an elongate body. The head and pronotum are black with blackish-brown margins, while the scutellum is black and the antennae dark brown. The elytra are bicolored, with the disc yellowish brown and with brownish black margins.

== Etymology ==
The species name refers to the two colors of the elytra.
