= Sparrmannia bechuana =

Scientific classification
- Kingdom: Animalia
- Phylum: Arthropoda
- Class: Insecta
- Order: Coleoptera
- Suborder: Polyphaga
- Infraorder: Scarabaeiformia
- Family: Scarabaeidae
- Genus: Sparrmannia
- Species: S. bechuana

Binomial name
- Sparrmannia bechuana Péringuey, 1904

Species of beetle

Sparrmannia bechuana is a species of beetle of the family Scarabaeidae. It is found in Botswana, Namibia and South Africa.

== Description ==
Adults reach a length of about 10.5–13.5 mm. The frons is pilose, with large, contiguous, setigerous punctures, and long long, whitish setae. The pronotum is sparsely pilose, but densely pilose beneath, with erect setae, which are yellowish medially and white laterally. The elytra are amber, with the margins and suture black. The pygidium is black.
