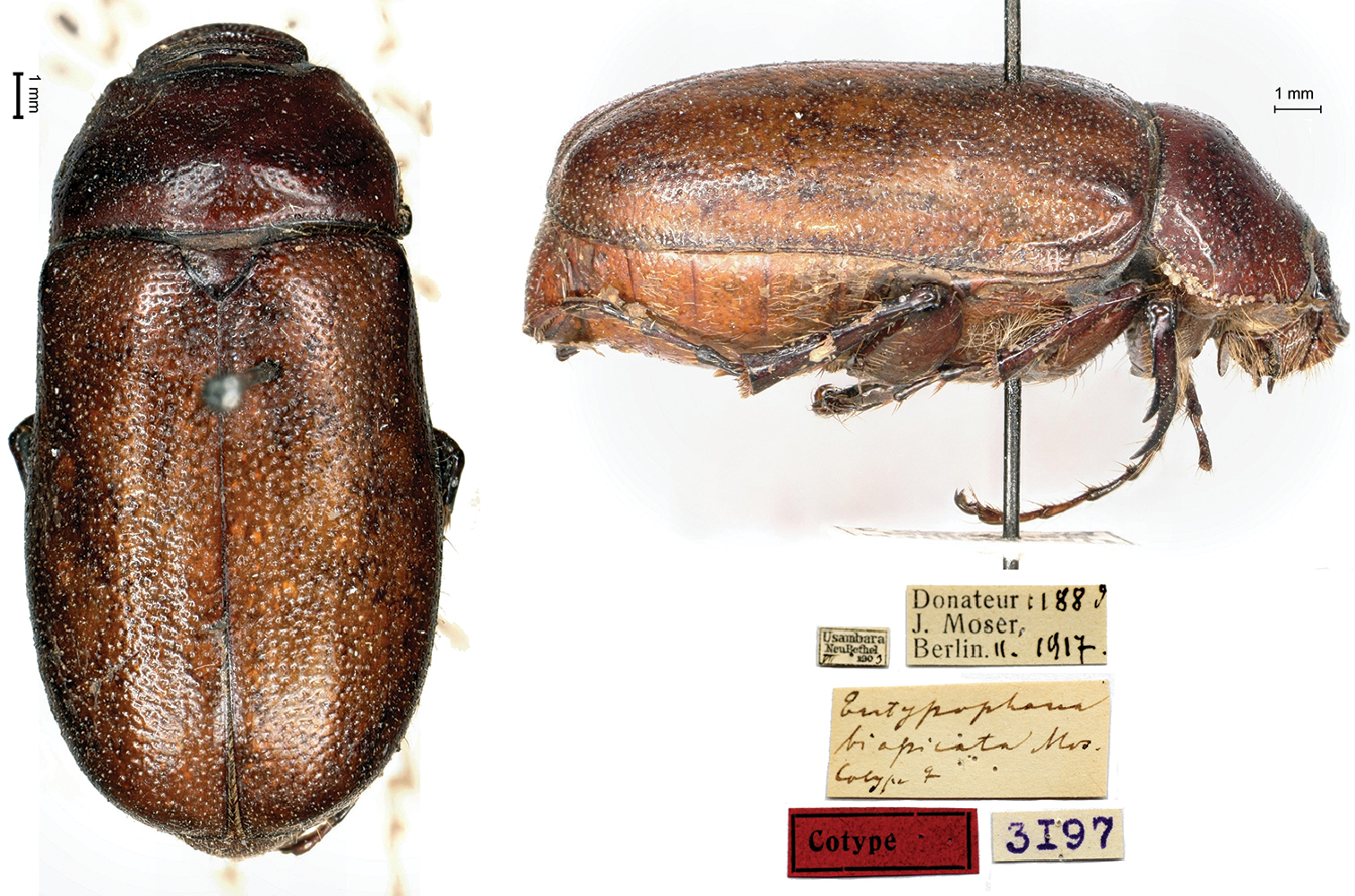

Scientific classification
- Kingdom: Animalia
- Phylum: Arthropoda
- Clade: Pancrustacea
- Class: Insecta
- Order: Coleoptera
- Suborder: Polyphaga
- Infraorder: Scarabaeiformia
- Family: Scarabaeidae
- Genus: Entypophana
- Species: E. biapicata

Binomial name
- Entypophana biapicata Moser, 1913

= Entypophana biapicata =

Species of beetle

Entypophana biapicata is a species of beetle of the family Scarabaeidae. It is found in Tanzania.

== Description ==
Adults reach a length of about 18–19 mm (0.71–0.75 in). They are reddish-brown, with the elytra yellowish-brown. The head is coarsely punctate, the frons is more or less smooth in the middle at the clypeus suture. The antennae are brown, with the club yellowish-brown. The pronotum is considerably wider than long, widest slightly behind the middle. The lateral margins are weakly crenate and have long yellow setae. The hind angles are obtuse, the anterior angles are rounded. The surface is strongly but sparsely punctate and bears several smooth areas. The scutellum have only a few punctures on the sides. The elytra are more densely punctured, and each puncture bears a very small bristle. The punctation of the pygidium is moderately dense, and the punctures have short, erect setae. The thorax is sparsely haired except in the center and the abdomen is widely punctured in the middle and somewhat more densely on the sides.
