= Coniopholis =

Scientific classification
- Kingdom: Animalia
- Phylum: Arthropoda
- Clade: Pancrustacea
- Class: Insecta
- Order: Coleoptera
- Suborder: Polyphaga
- Infraorder: Scarabaeiformia
- Family: Scarabaeidae
- Subfamily: Melolonthinae
- Tribe: Schizonychini
- Genus: Coniopholis; Erichson, 1847

Synonyms
- Coneopholis Burmeister, 1855

Genus of leaf beetles

Coniopholis is a genus of beetles belonging to the family Scarabaeidae.

== Species ==
- Coniopholis capensis Nonfried, 1906
- Coniopholis fraterna Kolbe, 1894
- Coniopholis fulvipes Moser, 1913
- Coniopholis lepidiota (Burmeister, 1855)
- Coniopholis nyassica Kolbe, 1894
- Coniopholis pectoralis Moser, 1913
- Coniopholis proxima Péringuey, 1904
- Coniopholis subnitida Nonfried, 1906
