= Sparrmannia namaqua =

Scientific classification
- Kingdom: Animalia
- Phylum: Arthropoda
- Class: Insecta
- Order: Coleoptera
- Suborder: Polyphaga
- Infraorder: Scarabaeiformia
- Family: Scarabaeidae
- Genus: Sparrmannia
- Species: S. namaqua

Binomial name
- Sparrmannia namaqua Péringuey, 1904

Species of beetle

Sparrmannia namaqua is a species of beetle of the family Scarabaeidae. It is found in South Africa (Northern Cape).

== Description ==
Adults reach a length of about 14–17 mm. The pronotum has long yellowish setae. The elytra are amber to brown, with the basal, lateral and sutural areas with scattered sub-erect setae, while the remaining surface is irregularly punctate and glabrous. The pygidium is brownish, with setigerous punctures and long, yellowish, erect setae.
