= Scapanoclypeus sinepunctatus =

Scientific classification
- Kingdom: Animalia
- Phylum: Arthropoda
- Clade: Pancrustacea
- Class: Insecta
- Order: Coleoptera
- Suborder: Polyphaga
- Infraorder: Scarabaeiformia
- Family: Scarabaeidae
- Genus: Scapanoclypeus
- Species: S. sinepunctatus

Binomial name
- Scapanoclypeus sinepunctatus Sehnal, 2013

Species of beetle

Scapanoclypeus sinepunctatus is a species of beetle of the family Scarabaeidae. It is found in South Africa (Northern Cape).

== Description ==
Adults reach a length of about 7.8 mm. They have an elongate body. The head is black, the pronotum yellowish-brown and the elytra ochraceous. The antennae are ochraceous with an ochreous-brown club.

== Etymology ==
The species name is derived from Latin sine (meaning without) and punctatus (meaning punctured) and refers to the impunctate clypeus.
