= Rhabdopholis albostriata =

Scientific classification
- Kingdom: Animalia
- Phylum: Arthropoda
- Clade: Pancrustacea
- Class: Insecta
- Order: Coleoptera
- Suborder: Polyphaga
- Infraorder: Scarabaeiformia
- Family: Scarabaeidae
- Genus: Rhabdopholis
- Species: R. albostriata

Binomial name
- Rhabdopholis albostriata Burmeister, 1855

Synonyms
- Haplobrachium sulcipenne Boheman, 1857

Species of beetle

Rhabdopholis albostriata is a species of beetle of the family Scarabaeidae. It is found in South Africa (KwaZulu-Natal).

== Description ==
Adults reach a length of about 19–21 mm (0.75–0.83 in) for males and 20–21 mm (0.79–0.83 in) for females. Males are dark brown to black, with white to off-white scales covering the head, thorax, elytra, abdominal sternites and legs. The pro-, meso- and metasternum are covered by dense fine setae. Females have a higher density of white scales, making them appear more white.
