= Psilonychus =

Scientific classification
- Kingdom: Animalia
- Phylum: Arthropoda
- Clade: Pancrustacea
- Class: Insecta
- Order: Coleoptera
- Suborder: Polyphaga
- Infraorder: Scarabaeiformia
- Family: Scarabaeidae
- Subfamily: Melolonthinae
- Tribe: Schizonychini
- Genus: Psilonychus; Burmeister, 1855

Genus of leaf beetles

Psilonychus is a genus of beetles belonging to the family Scarabaeidae.

== Species ==
- Psilonychus barkeri Péringuey, 1904
- Psilonychus deridens Péringuey, 1904
- Psilonychus duponti Burmeister, 1855
- Psilonychus eckloni Burmeister, 1855
- Psilonychus gracilis Burmeister, 1855
- Psilonychus groendahli (Billberg, 1820)
- Psilonychus perturbator Péringuey, 1904
- Psilonychus pilosicollis (Boheman, 1857)
