= Canuschiza insularis =

Scientific classification
- Kingdom: Animalia
- Phylum: Arthropoda
- Clade: Pancrustacea
- Class: Insecta
- Order: Coleoptera
- Suborder: Polyphaga
- Infraorder: Scarabaeiformia
- Family: Scarabaeidae
- Genus: Canuschiza
- Species: C. insularis

Binomial name
- Canuschiza insularis Lacroix, 1999

Species of beetle

Canuschiza insularis is a species of beetle of the family Scarabaeidae. It is found in Yemen (Socotra).

== Description ==
Adults reach a length of about 9.4–14.9 mm (0.37–0.59 in) for males and 12.2–14.7 mm (0.48–0.58 in) for females. They have an elongate, almost parallel, weakly convex body. The dorsal and ventral surfaces are moderately shiny. They are chestnut brown with tiny pale hairs.

== Life history ==
They have been recorded feeding on Jatropha unicostata.
