= Scapanoclypeus triapicalis =

Scientific classification
- Kingdom: Animalia
- Phylum: Arthropoda
- Class: Insecta
- Order: Coleoptera
- Suborder: Polyphaga
- Infraorder: Scarabaeiformia
- Family: Scarabaeidae
- Genus: Scapanoclypeus
- Species: S. triapicalis

Binomial name
- Scapanoclypeus triapicalis Sehnal, 2013

Species of beetle

Scapanoclypeus triapicalis is a species of beetle of the family Scarabaeidae. It is found in South Africa (Northern Cape).

== Description ==
Adults reach a length of about 5.2–6.1 mm. They have an elongate body. The head and pronotum are black with reddish-brown margins, the elytra are testaceous, the dorsum and abdomen dark brown and the antennae dark brown.

== Etymology ==
The species name is derived from Latin triapicalis (meaning having three apices) and refers to the shape of the transverse tricuspid frontal process.
