= Glyptoglossa =

Scientific classification
- Kingdom: Animalia
- Phylum: Arthropoda
- Clade: Pancrustacea
- Class: Insecta
- Order: Coleoptera
- Suborder: Polyphaga
- Infraorder: Scarabaeiformia
- Family: Scarabaeidae
- Subfamily: Melolonthinae
- Tribe: Schizonychini
- Genus: Glyptoglossa; Brenske, 1895

Genus of leaf beetles

Glyptoglossa is a genus of beetles belonging to the family Scarabaeidae.

== Species ==
- Glyptoglossa acta Evans, 1988
- Glyptoglossa alia Evans, 1988
- Glyptoglossa burmeisteri Brenske, 1898
- Glyptoglossa capensis Evans, 1988
- Glyptoglossa dispar Péringuey, 1904
- Glyptoglossa lurida (Burmeister, 1855)
- Glyptoglossa namaquensis Péringuey, 1904
