= Heteroschiza =

Scientific classification
- Kingdom: Animalia
- Phylum: Arthropoda
- Clade: Pancrustacea
- Class: Insecta
- Order: Coleoptera
- Suborder: Polyphaga
- Infraorder: Scarabaeiformia
- Family: Scarabaeidae
- Subfamily: Melolonthinae
- Tribe: Schizonychini
- Genus: Heteroschiza; Moser, 1917
- Species: H. plumata

Binomial name
- Heteroschiza plumata Moser, 1917

Genus of beetles

Heteroschiza is a genus of beetle of the family Scarabaeidae. It is monotypic, being represented by the single species, Heteroschiza plumata, which is found in Cameroon.

== Description ==
Adults reach a length of about 13–14 mm (0.51–0.55 in). They are brown and glossy, with the head and pronotum red and the antennae brown. The pronotum is twice as wide as it is long, arched in the middle. The lateral margins are not notched, the anterior angles are almost right-angled, the posterior angles are obtuse. The surface is moderately densely punctate, the punctures bearing minute scales. The scutellum is punctate except in the middle. The elytra are somewhat transversely wrinkled, the moderately densely spaced punctures are covered with small lanceolate scales. On the pygidium, the scales of the punctures are oval. The thorax, episterna, and hind coxae are covered with whitish hairs, which arise in tufts from the individual punctures.
