= Sparrmannia leo =

Scientific classification
- Kingdom: Animalia
- Phylum: Arthropoda
- Clade: Pancrustacea
- Class: Insecta
- Order: Coleoptera
- Suborder: Polyphaga
- Infraorder: Scarabaeiformia
- Family: Scarabaeidae
- Genus: Sparrmannia
- Species: S. leo

Binomial name
- Sparrmannia leo (Gyllenhal, 1817)

Synonyms
- Melolontha leo Gyllenhal, 1817

Species of beetle

Sparrmannia leo is a species of beetle of the family Scarabaeidae. It is found in South Africa.

== Description ==
Adults reach a length of about 16–19 mm (0.63–0.75 in). They are testaceous, shining and densely clothed with pallid hairs. The elytra are glabrous.
