= Sparrmannia dekindti =

Scientific classification
- Kingdom: Animalia
- Phylum: Arthropoda
- Class: Insecta
- Order: Coleoptera
- Suborder: Polyphaga
- Infraorder: Scarabaeiformia
- Family: Scarabaeidae
- Genus: Sparrmannia
- Species: S. dekindti

Binomial name
- Sparrmannia dekindti Nonfried, 1906

Species of beetle

Sparrmannia dekindti is a species of beetle of the family Scarabaeidae. It is found in Angola.

== Description ==
Adults reach a length of about 20 mm. The pronotum has long yellowish setae and the basal one-third has a medial longitudinal impunctate area. The elytra are dark brown with a deeply punctate surface. The pygidium is brown, with scattered setigerous punctures and yellowish, erect setae.
