= Alien Empire =

- Genre: Science and Nature
- Narrated by: John Shrapnel
- Composer: Martin Kiszko
- Country of origin: United Kingdom
- Original language: English
- No. of series: 1
- No. of episodes: 6

Production
- Producer: Steve Nicholls
- Running time: 30 minutes

Original release
- Network: BBC One, PBS
- Release: 11 February – 13 February 1996

Alien Empire was a documentary television series about insects produced by the BBC, and first broadcast by PBS in 1996. It was subtitled Inside the Kingdom of the Insect or A Journey to the World of Insects.

== Episodes ==
The following six episodes were broadcast on BBC1:

- Episode 1: Hardware. 15 February 1996.
- Episode 2: Replicators. 22 February 1996.
- Episode 3: Battlezone. 29 February 1996.
- Episode 4: Voyagers. 7 March 1996.
- Episode 5: Metropolis. 14 March 1996.
- Episode 6: War of the Worlds. 21 March 1996.

== Broadcast and release ==
Alien Empire was first broadcast in the United States on PBS, as part of the series Nature, in three daily parts, from Sunday 11 to Tuesday 13 February 1996.

Alien Empire was first broadcast in the United Kingdom on BBC1, as a six part series (and not as part of the series Nature), from 15 February to 21 March 1996, on Thursdays at 8pm.

=== Video ===
Alien Empire was released on VHS, in the United Kingdom by the BBC and in the United States by Time Life Video, in 1996.

== Reception ==
The series was "popular". Its success with younger audiences inspired the creation of Bug City, a direct-to-video educational series aimed at children.

== Book ==
The book Alien Empire: An Exploration of the Lives of Insects, by Christopher O'Toole is a companion to the series, published, by BBC Books in London and by HarperCollins in New York, in 1995.
