= Canuschiza =

Scientific classification
- Kingdom: Animalia
- Phylum: Arthropoda
- Clade: Pancrustacea
- Class: Insecta
- Order: Coleoptera
- Suborder: Polyphaga
- Infraorder: Scarabaeiformia
- Family: Scarabaeidae
- Subfamily: Melolonthinae
- Tribe: Schizonychini
- Genus: Canuschiza; Lacroix, 1999

Genus of leaf beetles

Canuschiza is a genus of beetles belonging to the family Scarabaeidae.

== Species ==
- Canuschiza adah Sehnal, Král & Bezděk, 2014
- Canuschiza croton Sehnal, Král & Bezděk, 2014
- Canuschiza dracaena Sehnal, Král & Bezděk, 2014
- Canuschiza firmihin Sehnal, Král & Bezděk, 2014
- Canuschiza hagher Sehnal, Král & Bezděk, 2014
- Canuschiza insularis Lacroix, 1999
- Canuschiza jatropha Sehnal, Král & Bezděk, 2014
- Canuschiza minuta Lacroix, 1999
- Canuschiza skand Sehnal, Král & Bezděk, 2014
- Canuschiza zerig Sehnal, Král & Bezděk, 2017
