= Canuschiza croton =

Scientific classification
- Kingdom: Animalia
- Phylum: Arthropoda
- Clade: Pancrustacea
- Class: Insecta
- Order: Coleoptera
- Suborder: Polyphaga
- Infraorder: Scarabaeiformia
- Family: Scarabaeidae
- Genus: Canuschiza
- Species: C. croton

Binomial name
- Canuschiza croton Sehnal, Král & Bezděk, 2014

Species of beetle

Canuschiza croton is a species of beetle of the family Scarabaeidae. It is found in Yemen (Socotra).

== Description ==
Adults reach a length of about 11.2–14.3 mm (0.44–0.56 in) for males and 13.2–13.9 mm (0.52–0.55 in) for females. They have an elongate, almost parallel, weakly convex body. The dorsal and ventral surfaces are moderately shiny. They are ochre with tiny pale hairs.

== Etymology ==
The species name is derived from the Latin name of Croton sulcifructus, a plant endemic to Socotra.
