= Scapanoclypeus aberrans =

Scientific classification
- Kingdom: Animalia
- Phylum: Arthropoda
- Class: Insecta
- Order: Coleoptera
- Suborder: Polyphaga
- Infraorder: Scarabaeiformia
- Family: Scarabaeidae
- Genus: Scapanoclypeus
- Species: S. aberrans

Binomial name
- Scapanoclypeus aberrans (Frey, 1974)

Synonyms
- Trichinopus aberrans Frey, 1974

Species of beetle

Scapanoclypeus aberrans is a species of beetle of the family Scarabaeidae. It is found in Namibia.

== Description ==
Adults reach a length of about 5–8 mm. The clypeus is impunctate, glabrous and dull, while the frons and vertex are piceous. The former with flavous setae. The pronotum is piceous or dark castaneous and the elytra and pygidium are brown. On disc of the pronotum is impunctate medially, while the remaining areas are shining with scattered setigerous punctures. On the elytra, the humeral, lateral, and apical margins are darker than the disc.
