= Sparrmannia transvaalica =

Scientific classification
- Kingdom: Animalia
- Phylum: Arthropoda
- Class: Insecta
- Order: Coleoptera
- Suborder: Polyphaga
- Infraorder: Scarabaeiformia
- Family: Scarabaeidae
- Genus: Sparrmannia
- Species: S. transvaalica

Binomial name
- Sparrmannia transvaalica Péringuey, 1904

Species of beetle

Sparrmannia transvaalica is a species of beetle of the family Scarabaeidae. It is found in Botswana, Namibia, South Africa (Free State, Limpopo) and Zimbabwe.

== Description ==
Adults reach a length of about 20–25.5 mm. The pronotum has long yellowish setae. The elytra are pale to dark yellowish-brown, with the basal one-third sparsely setose, and the remaining surface irregularly punctate and glabrous. The pygidium is yellowish-brown, sparsely setose and with yellowish setae.
