= Aposchiza =

Scientific classification
- Kingdom: Animalia
- Phylum: Arthropoda
- Clade: Pancrustacea
- Class: Insecta
- Order: Coleoptera
- Suborder: Polyphaga
- Infraorder: Scarabaeiformia
- Family: Scarabaeidae
- Subfamily: Melolonthinae
- Tribe: Schizonychini
- Genus: Aposchiza; Brenske, 1903
- Species: A. schulzi

Binomial name
- Aposchiza schulzi Brenske, 1903

Genus of beetles

Aposchiza is a genus of beetle of the family Scarabaeidae. It is monotypic, being represented by the single species, Aposchiza schulzi, which is found in Tanzania.

== Description ==
Adults reach a length of about 19 mm (0.75 in). They are dark brown, with the elytra shading into reddish. They are densely scaled, with the underlying surface glossy and translucent. The clypeus is short, not emarginate at the center of the anterior margin, with broadly rounded corners. It is coarsely rugose-punctate like the flat frons, both bearing fine scales. The pronotum is rather elongated, with the anterior corners are almost acute and the posterior corners sharply projecting. The anterior margin has a faint membranous border in the center, projecting slightly there, while the lateral margin is strongly rounded in the middle and distinctly sinuate posteriorly. The surface is densely and coarsely rugose, with scales only slightly larger than those on the head. They are lanceolate in the center and rounded at the sides, and interspersed here and there with coarser, rugose tubercles. The transverse ridge at the base and a spot in front of the scutellum are smooth and glossy. The rounded scutellum is lightly scaled. The ribless elytra are uniformly rugose-punctate and covered with lanceolate scales and the lateral margin is slightly constricted starting at the hind coxae, where the membranous border also begins. The rounded pygidium is densely scaled, as is the abdomen, the last segment of which is very small.
