= Rhabdopholis margaretae =

Scientific classification
- Kingdom: Animalia
- Phylum: Arthropoda
- Clade: Pancrustacea
- Class: Insecta
- Order: Coleoptera
- Suborder: Polyphaga
- Infraorder: Scarabaeiformia
- Family: Scarabaeidae
- Genus: Rhabdopholis
- Species: R. margaretae

Binomial name
- Rhabdopholis margaretae Harrison, 2004

Species of beetle

Rhabdopholis margaretae is a species of beetle of the family Scarabaeidae. It is found in South Africa (KwaZulu-Natal).

== Description ==
Adults reach a length of about 17–18 mm (0.67–0.71 in) for males and 18–20 mm (0.71–0.79 in) for females. Males are dark brown to black, with white to off-white scales covering the head, thorax, elytra, abdominal sternites and legs. The pro-, meso-, and metasternum are covered by dense fine setae. Females have more white scales.

== Etymology ==
The species is named for Margaret A.C. Harrison.
