= Glyptoglossa lurida =

Scientific classification
- Kingdom: Animalia
- Phylum: Arthropoda
- Clade: Pancrustacea
- Class: Insecta
- Order: Coleoptera
- Suborder: Polyphaga
- Infraorder: Scarabaeiformia
- Family: Scarabaeidae
- Genus: Glyptoglossa
- Species: G. lurida

Binomial name
- Glyptoglossa lurida (Burmeister, 1855)

Synonyms
- Schizonycha lurida Burmeister, 1855

Species of beetle

Glyptoglossa lurida is a species of beetle of the family Scarabaeidae. It is found in South Africa (Northern Cape).

== Description ==
Adults reach a length of about 19.5–22 mm (0.77–0.87 in). Males are testaceous (with the head sometimes ferruginous) and shining. The clypeus is deeply and closely punctured and the pronotum has irregular deep punctures, which are more scattered in the posterior part where they bear each a sub-erect, long flavous hair, the anterior and lateral margins have a fringe of similar hairs, and the base is thickly but more briefly pubescent. The elytra are without costules or striae except the sutural stria, and are finely and closely, yet deeply punctured. The pygidium is impunctate like the exposed part of the propygidium. The two basal segments of the abdomen densely pubescent laterally, the others with a few fine hairs. Females are entirely like the males, and can be distinguished only by the more dilated laminate spurs of the hind tibiae and the slightly shorter club of the antennae.
