= Anartioschiza kivuensis =

Scientific classification
- Kingdom: Animalia
- Phylum: Arthropoda
- Clade: Pancrustacea
- Class: Insecta
- Order: Coleoptera
- Suborder: Polyphaga
- Infraorder: Scarabaeiformia
- Family: Scarabaeidae
- Genus: Anartioschiza
- Species: A. kivuensis

Binomial name
- Anartioschiza kivuensis Burgeon, 1946

Species of beetle

Anartioschiza kivuensis is a species of beetle of the family Scarabaeidae. It is found in the Democratic Republic of the Congo.
