= Anartioschiza sororia =

Scientific classification
- Kingdom: Animalia
- Phylum: Arthropoda
- Clade: Pancrustacea
- Class: Insecta
- Order: Coleoptera
- Suborder: Polyphaga
- Infraorder: Scarabaeiformia
- Family: Scarabaeidae
- Genus: Anartioschiza
- Species: A. sororia

Binomial name
- Anartioschiza sororia Moser, 1913

Species of beetle

Anartioschiza sororia is a species of beetle of the family Scarabaeidae. It is found in Cameroon.

== Description ==
Adults reach a length of about 22 mm (0.87 in). They are similar to Anartioschiza major but somewhat shorter. They are black with brown legs, and the elytra have a bluish sheen. The head is similarly formed to that of major, though not quite as densely punctate. The pronotum also has the same shape as that of major. It is weakly wrinkled, moderately densely punctate, the punctures are strong, with barely visible setae on the disc, and covered with ovate scales on the sides. The elytra are slightly more densely punctate than in major, the scales are equally small, but more pointed posteriorly, and the rib next to the lateral margin is indistinct. The pygidium is densely covered with large, rounded, white scales.
