= Gymnoschiza setiventris =

Scientific classification
- Kingdom: Animalia
- Phylum: Arthropoda
- Clade: Pancrustacea
- Class: Insecta
- Order: Coleoptera
- Suborder: Polyphaga
- Infraorder: Scarabaeiformia
- Family: Scarabaeidae
- Genus: Gymnoschiza
- Species: G. setiventris

Binomial name
- Gymnoschiza setiventris Moser, 1917

Species of beetle

Gymnoschiza setiventris is a species of beetle of the family Scarabaeidae. It is found in Cameroon and the Democratic Republic of the Congo.

== Description ==
Adults reach a length of about 17 mm. They are reddish-brown, with the head and pronotum darker. The head is covered with large, flat, erect-bristle-like punctures. The lateral margins of the pronotum are notched and have yellow setae. The surface is punctured. The punctures are large and flat and have small setae. The scutellum is covered with short-bristle-like punctures. The elytra are very finely leathery and sculpted. They are quite densely punctured, the punctures covered with short, erect setae.
