= Anartioschiza diversa =

Scientific classification
- Kingdom: Animalia
- Phylum: Arthropoda
- Clade: Pancrustacea
- Class: Insecta
- Order: Coleoptera
- Suborder: Polyphaga
- Infraorder: Scarabaeiformia
- Family: Scarabaeidae
- Genus: Anartioschiza
- Species: A. diversa

Binomial name
- Anartioschiza diversa Moser, 1913

Species of beetle

Anartioschiza diversa is a species of beetle of the family Scarabaeidae. It is found in Cameroon and Gabon.

== Description ==
Adults reach a length of about 16 mm (0.63 in). The head is rather coarsely punctured, the anterior margin of the clypeus weakly emarginate. The pronotum is more than twice as wide as it is long, strongly arched in the middle, the posterior angles are obtuse, the slightly projecting anterior angles somewhat acute. The surface is strongly and rather densely punctured, each puncture bearing a tiny bristle. A smooth median line is marked on the scutellum. The elytra are almost as punctured as the pronotum, the small scales of the punctures being somewhat bristle-like. The thorax, with the exception of a smooth transverse spot, is covered, as are the episterna, with sparsely spaced, egg-shaped white scales. The punctation of the abdomen is widely spaced in the middle, becoming somewhat narrower at the sides. The scales of the spots are narrow, egg-shaped, or lanceolate.
