= Crepischiza usambarae =

Scientific classification
- Kingdom: Animalia
- Phylum: Arthropoda
- Clade: Pancrustacea
- Class: Insecta
- Order: Coleoptera
- Suborder: Polyphaga
- Infraorder: Scarabaeiformia
- Family: Scarabaeidae
- Genus: Crepischiza
- Species: C. usambarae

Binomial name
- Crepischiza usambarae Brenske, 1903

Species of beetle

Crepischiza usambarae is a species of beetle of the family Scarabaeidae. It is found in Tanzania.

== Description ==
Adults reach a length of about 17 mm (0.67 in). They are yellowish-brown and glossy, with scattered, darker, irregular spots. The clypeus projects distinctly, with rounded sides and a straight anterior margin. It is coarsely punctate but smooth in the center. The frons is even more densely covered with the same coarse punctures, remaining almost free of them in the center. The pronotum is strongly narrowed anteriorly, with acute anterior angles and the lateral margin is straight from the middle to the rear, with right-angled posterior angles. The anterior margin is weakly emarginate and narrowly bordered - densely punctate along the border, while the surface is coarsely and sparsely punctate - and the posterior margin is slightly rough. The scutellum is almost impunctate. The elytra are coarsely punctate, with tiny hairs within the punctures. These punctures are slightly more distinct than those on the pronotum. The pygidium is rounded and very densely, coarsely, and rugosely punctate, with tiny hairs. The abdomen is glabrous in the center and sparsely covered laterally with oval, pointed scales. The scales are somewhat denser on the hind coxae and the sternum.
