= Coniopholis lepidiota =

Scientific classification
- Kingdom: Animalia
- Phylum: Arthropoda
- Clade: Pancrustacea
- Class: Insecta
- Order: Coleoptera
- Suborder: Polyphaga
- Infraorder: Scarabaeiformia
- Family: Scarabaeidae
- Genus: Coniopholis
- Species: C. lepidiota

Binomial name
- Coniopholis lepidiota (Burmeister, 1855)

Synonyms
- Coneopholis lepidiota Burmeister, 1855

Species of beetle

Coniopholis lepidiota is a species of beetle of the family Scarabaeidae. It is found in South Africa (KwaZulu-Natal).

== Description ==
Adults reach a length of about 12–19.5 mm (0.47–0.77 in). They are totally dark chestnut, or chestnut-brown, with the elytra light chestnut, slightly rufescent and with the club of the antennae flavescent. The head and clypeus are covered with closely set, nearly contiguous punctures, the walls of which are raised on the head, and each puncture filled with a somewhat round, white scale. The pronotum has the outer margins plainly crenulate and the disk is covered with nearly confluent, round, deep punctures containing a round white scale, in the anterior part there is a central, longitudinal impression. The scutellum is smooth in the centre, punctulate and scaly laterally. The elytra are covered with somewhat rounded punctures separated from each other by a smooth space nearly equal to their own diameter, and containing a slightly elongated white scale. The propygidium is almost completely covered by the elytra, while the pygidium is covered with nearly contiguous punctures, each with a white scale.
