= Glyptoglossa dispar =

Scientific classification
- Kingdom: Animalia
- Phylum: Arthropoda
- Clade: Pancrustacea
- Class: Insecta
- Order: Coleoptera
- Suborder: Polyphaga
- Infraorder: Scarabaeiformia
- Family: Scarabaeidae
- Genus: Glyptoglossa
- Species: G. dispar

Binomial name
- Glyptoglossa dispar Péringuey, 1904

Species of beetle

Glyptoglossa dispar is a species of beetle of the family Scarabaeidae. It is found in South Africa (Northern Cape).

== Description ==
Adults reach a length of about 19.5–20 mm (0.77–0.79 in). They are very light flavous and shining. The clypeus has some fine, shallow, somewhat scattered punctures and the pronotum is covered with nearly contiguous small punctures, each bearing a very long, appressed flavous hair, the whole forming a somewhat dense pubescence. The scutellum is almost impunctate, but clothed with long appressed hairs springing from the base. The elytra are covered with closely set, fine punctures, and have no traces of costules or striae except the juxta-sutural one. The greatest part of the propygidium is uncovered and finely aciculate and the pygidium is closely punctured in the median part only, the sides being impunctate. The abdomen is finely punctate, and has a few, scattered, long, fine appressed hairs.
