= Psilonychus groendahli =

Scientific classification
- Kingdom: Animalia
- Phylum: Arthropoda
- Clade: Pancrustacea
- Class: Insecta
- Order: Coleoptera
- Suborder: Polyphaga
- Infraorder: Scarabaeiformia
- Family: Scarabaeidae
- Genus: Psilonychus
- Species: P. groendahli

Binomial name
- Psilonychus groendahli (Billberg, 1820)

Synonyms
- Melolontha groendahli Billberg, 1820; Coniopholis costicollis Boheman, 1857

Species of beetle

Psilonychus groendahli is a species of beetle of the family Scarabaeidae. It is found in South Africa (KwaZulu-Natal).

== Description ==
Adults reach a length of about 10 mm (0.39 in). They are bronze-green and clothed with scales. These scales are flavescent on the upper side, and very few in number on the pronotum which is very coarsely punctured and clothed with very long, erect, dense flavescent hairs. The head is also hairy, and the scales on the clypeus are also somewhat hair-like. The latter is moderately emarginate in front and not acuminate or angular laterally. The median impression is absent, and there are therefore no smooth walls, but the supra-basal and supra-lateral patches are distinct. The elytra are very cylindrical and more costulate than in related species, the three dorsal bands of slightly flavescent scales are sub-obliquely interrupted past the median part in a more or less indistinct manner. The scutellum is impunctate. The antennae are chestnut-red.
