= Library Video Company =

Library Video Company is an educational video distributor founded in 1985 by Andrew Schlessinger and based in West Conshohocken, Pennsylvania. A subsidiary of the company, Schlessinger Media, was founded in 1990 for the purposes of producing original for-the-classroom educational videos.

== Overview ==
In 2005, Library Video Company merged with K-12 video networking solution provider, SAFARI Video Networks, founded in 1987 by Tim Beekman, to form SAFARI Montage. SAFARI Montage provides K-12 schools and districts with digital learning object repository, curriculum management, video-on-demand, streaming video, and IPTV products. In 2020, SAFARI Montage introduced a cloud-based service in addition to its traditional server-based product. The SAFARI Montage platform integrates with various third-party learning platforms, including Google Classroom, Microsoft Teams, and many popular learning management systems (LMSs) through partnerships and adherence to IMS Global interoperability standards, such as LTI, Common Cartridge, and OneRoster. In 2014, Library Video Company sold its DVD business to Cerebellum Corporation in order to refocus entirely on its SAFARI digital platforms.

== Partnerships ==
Educational publishers, including PBS and WGBH have partnered with SAFARI Montage to bring educational programs to schools in a digital format. In May 2012, PBS announced an agreement to renew and expand its partnership with SAFARI Montage, making SAFARI Montage the primary major commercial digital distributor of PBS’ library of full-length programs to schools in the United States. This agreement also added hundreds of additional PBS titles to those already available through SAFARI Montage.
