= Gymnoschiza gracilipes =

Scientific classification
- Kingdom: Animalia
- Phylum: Arthropoda
- Clade: Pancrustacea
- Class: Insecta
- Order: Coleoptera
- Suborder: Polyphaga
- Infraorder: Scarabaeiformia
- Family: Scarabaeidae
- Genus: Gymnoschiza
- Species: G. gracilipes

Binomial name
- Gymnoschiza gracilipes (Brenske, 1898)

Synonyms
- Anartioschiza gracilipes Brenske, 1898

Species of beetle

Gymnoschiza gracilipes is a species of beetle of the family Scarabaeidae. It is found in the Democratic Republic of the Congo and the Republic of the Congo.

== Description ==
Adults reach a length of about 14 mm (0.55 in). They are shiny brown, and seemingly without hairs. The pronotum is short, very finely toothed laterally, rather densely punctate, with a sharp ridge at the posterior margin. The scutellum is elongate. The elytra are densely, slightly wrinkled-punctate, only laterally are traces of tiny hairs noticeable in the punctures. The pygidium is more smooth than punctured. The abdomen is uniformly densely punctured, only on the penultimate segment with a row of longer hairs. The thorax and coxae are without hairs.
