= Stephanopholis =

Scientific classification
- Kingdom: Animalia
- Phylum: Arthropoda
- Clade: Pancrustacea
- Class: Insecta
- Order: Coleoptera
- Suborder: Polyphaga
- Infraorder: Scarabaeiformia
- Family: Scarabaeidae
- Subfamily: Melolonthinae
- Tribe: Schizonychini
- Genus: Stephanopholis; Brenske, 1896

Genus of leaf beetles

Stephanopholis is a genus of beetles belonging to the family Scarabaeidae.

== Species ==
- Stephanopholis cribricollis Arrow, 1916
- Stephanopholis lopezi Chapin, 1931
- Stephanopholis melolonthoides (Brenske, 1892)
- Stephanopholis philippinensis Brenske, 1896
- Stephanopholis rubicundus Arrow, 1916
- Stephanopholis singalensis Brenske, 1896
