= Psilonychus deridens =

Scientific classification
- Kingdom: Animalia
- Phylum: Arthropoda
- Clade: Pancrustacea
- Class: Insecta
- Order: Coleoptera
- Suborder: Polyphaga
- Infraorder: Scarabaeiformia
- Family: Scarabaeidae
- Genus: Psilonychus
- Species: P. deridens

Binomial name
- Psilonychus deridens Péringuey, 1904

Species of beetle

Psilonychus deridens is a species of beetle of the family Scarabaeidae. It is found in South Africa (KwaZulu-Natal) and Zimbabwe.

== Description ==
Adults reach a length of about 13–13.5 mm (0.51–0.53 in). Males are dark bronze-green and moderately shining, while females are testaceous-red. The antennae are piceous in males, red, with the club infuscated in females. The head has a fairly distinct clypeal raised line in both sexes, and the head and clypeus are clothed with long, greyish hairs in males and are without any scale, but with some squamiform hairs in females. The elytra have four rows of not very closely set, white, elongated scales, broadly interrupted two or three times. The edge of the propygidium, pygidium and abdomen are clothed with denser and slightly longer scales.
