= Psilonychus gracilis =

Scientific classification
- Kingdom: Animalia
- Phylum: Arthropoda
- Clade: Pancrustacea
- Class: Insecta
- Order: Coleoptera
- Suborder: Polyphaga
- Infraorder: Scarabaeiformia
- Family: Scarabaeidae
- Genus: Psilonychus
- Species: P. gracilis

Binomial name
- Psilonychus gracilis Burmeister, 1855

Synonyms
- Coniopholis decora Boheman, 1857

Species of beetle

Psilonychus gracilis is a species of beetle of the family Scarabaeidae. It is found in South Africa (KwaZulu-Natal, Mpumalanga, Gauteng. North West).

== Description ==
Adults reach a length of about 12–13 mm (0.47–0.51 in). Males are bronze-green, with the elytra and legs often rufescent. They are clothed on the upper side with white lanceolate scales, disposed on the elytra in four broad bands, divided by a narrow, smooth line, and having a broad, sub-quadrate, denuded patch under the scutellum, and a narrower but longer transverse band slightly past the median part, extending across the median part of the disk. The clypeus is hexagonal and covered like the head with somewhat hairlike scales springing from the scrobiculate punctures. The antennae, palpi and legs are rufescent. The pronotum is plainly grooved for two-thirds of the length, and with the walls of the groove broadly smooth, the basal, elongate denuded patch is very distinct on each side, the hairs on the outer margins and in the base are white, but occasionally flavescent. The scutellum is impunctate and the elytra are cylindrical and non-costulate.
