= Schizonychini =

Scientific classification
- Kingdom: Animalia
- Phylum: Arthropoda
- Clade: Pancrustacea
- Class: Insecta
- Order: Coleoptera
- Suborder: Polyphaga
- Infraorder: Scarabaeiformia
- Family: Scarabaeidae
- Subfamily: Melolonthinae
- Tribe: Schizonychini; Burmeister, 1855

Tribe of beetles

Schizonychini is a tribe of scarab beetles in the family Scarabaeidae.

== Genera ==
The following genera are recognised in the tribe Schizonychini:

- Anartioschiza Kolbe, 1894
- Aposchiza Brenske, 1903
- Atysilla Strand, 1942
- Aulacoschiza Decelle, 1973
- Canuschiza Lacroix, 1999
- Cnemoschiza Decelle, 1979
- Coelogenia Moser, 1913
- Coniopholis Erichson, 1847
- Crepischiza Brenske, 1903
- Entypophana Moser, 1913
- Glyptoglossa Brenske, 1895
- Gymnoschiza Moser, 1914
- Hecistopsilus Kolbe, 1894
- Heteroschiza Moser, 1917
- Idionycha Arrow, 1932
- Lepidotrogus Kolbe, 1894
- Lepischiza Moser, 1914
- Pseudoschizonycha Keith, 2006
- Psilonychus Burmeister, 1855
- Redotus Fairmaire, 1860
- Schizonycha Dejean, 1833
- Stephanopholis Brenske, 1896
- Trichoschiza Moser, 1917
- Wadaia Itoh, 1993
