= Arthur V. Evans =

American entomologist

Arthur V. Evans is an American entomologist and author, focusing on beetle taxonomy.

Evans has written several books about animals and species, which are currently held in over 7,444 total libraries worldwide. One of his books, Beetles of Eastern North America, was published by Princeton University Press and was positively reviewed.

Evans grew up in the Antelope Valley just north of Los Angeles and attended Palmdale High School, graduating in 1975. He then attended California State University, Long Beach, where he received his bachelor's in entomology in 1981 and a master's in biology with an emphasis in entomology in 1984. He earned his PhD in entomology from the University of Pretoria in 1988.

In 2000, he stepped down after 10 years as Director of the Insect Zoo at the Natural History Museum of Los Angeles County, moving to Virginia, where he became a Research Associate of the Smithsonian Institution.

He co-hosted the 1998 television series Bug City. He also co-hosted a radio show called What's Bugging You? on WCVE-FM.
