= Eulepida lepidota =

Scientific classification
- Kingdom: Animalia
- Phylum: Arthropoda
- Clade: Pancrustacea
- Class: Insecta
- Order: Coleoptera
- Suborder: Polyphaga
- Infraorder: Scarabaeiformia
- Family: Scarabaeidae
- Genus: Eulepida
- Species: E. lepidota

Binomial name
- Eulepida lepidota (Klug, 1855)

Synonyms
- Leucopholis lepidota Klug, 1855

Species of beetle

Eulepida lepidota is a species of beetle of the family Scarabaeidae. It is found in Mozambique and on Mayotte.

== Description ==
They are very similar to Eulepida mashona, but the elytra are subsulcate and have broad, weakly impressed longitudinal grooves.
