= Byrsalepis nyassica =

Scientific classification
- Kingdom: Animalia
- Phylum: Arthropoda
- Clade: Pancrustacea
- Class: Insecta
- Order: Coleoptera
- Suborder: Polyphaga
- Infraorder: Scarabaeiformia
- Family: Scarabaeidae
- Genus: Byrsalepis
- Species: B. nyassica

Binomial name
- Byrsalepis nyassica Brenske, 1898

Species of beetle

Byrsalepis nyassica is a species of beetle of the family Scarabaeidae. It is found in Tanzania.

== Description ==
Adults reach a length of about 20 mm (0.79 in). They are very similar to Byrsalepis mikindana, with the coloor also reddish-brown, but the bald patches are somewhat darker, the scales are somewhat stronger everywhere, and the chest is densely covered with white scales, with individual hairs in between.
