= Chaetocosmetes vethi =

Scientific classification
- Kingdom: Animalia
- Phylum: Arthropoda
- Clade: Pancrustacea
- Class: Insecta
- Order: Coleoptera
- Suborder: Polyphaga
- Infraorder: Scarabaeiformia
- Family: Scarabaeidae
- Genus: Chaetocosmetes
- Species: C. vethi

Binomial name
- Chaetocosmetes vethi Moser, 1917

Species of beetle

Chaetocosmetes vethi is a species of beetle of the family Scarabaeidae. It is found in Indonesia (Sumatra).

== Description ==
Adults reach a length of about 9 mm (0.35 in). They are very similar to Chaetocosmetes javanus. They are of the same size, but slightly wider. The punctures on the upper surface are larger than in javanus and on the head and pronotum, the punctation is more reticulate. On the elytra, the ribs have disappeared, only when viewed obliquely are traces of them still visible. The punctation of the pygidium is denser.
