= Asthenopholis crypsis =

Scientific classification
- Kingdom: Animalia
- Phylum: Arthropoda
- Clade: Pancrustacea
- Class: Insecta
- Order: Coleoptera
- Suborder: Polyphaga
- Infraorder: Scarabaeiformia
- Family: Scarabaeidae
- Genus: Asthenopholis
- Species: A. crypsis

Binomial name
- Asthenopholis crypsis Harrison, 2009

Species of beetle

Asthenopholis crypsis is a species of beetle of the family Scarabaeidae. It is found in South Africa (KwaZulu-Natal, Western Cape).

== Description ==
Adults reach a length of about 14–16 mm (0.55–0.63 in). The head, thorax and scutellum are black, and the elytra are russet brown. They are similar to black and red forms of Asthenopholis minor, and can only be identified by examination of the male genitalia.

== Etymology ==
The species is named crypsis (a biological term meaning camouflaged) and refers to its similarity to Asthenopholis minor.
