= Afrolepis pygidialis =

Scientific classification
- Kingdom: Animalia
- Phylum: Arthropoda
- Clade: Pancrustacea
- Class: Insecta
- Order: Coleoptera
- Suborder: Polyphaga
- Infraorder: Scarabaeiformia
- Family: Scarabaeidae
- Genus: Afrolepis
- Species: A. pygidialis

Binomial name
- Afrolepis pygidialis (Brenske, 1903)

Synonyms
- Oligolepis pygidialis Brenske, 1903

Species of beetle

Afrolepis pygidialis is a species of beetle of the family Scarabaeidae. It is found in Cameroon and Gabon.

== Description ==
Adults reach a length of about 19 mm (0.75 in). They are similar to Afrolepis unguicularis, but not velvety. Instead they have a pruinose sheen. They are also more slender. The pronotum has the same shape, with lateral margins that protrude in the middle and curve backwards. The center is bare, flanked by scattered small, rounded scales. Between the center and the lateral margin, there is a somewhat densely scaled oblique longitudinal line, which forms a broader cluster of scales in the anterior third, situated within a distinct depression. The elytra are slightly ribbed and the oblique longitudinal groove is faint. The pygidium is pointed and curved upwards in a beak-like fashion, bearing very tiny, scattered scales.
