= Cyphochilus (disambiguation) =

Cyphochilus is the scientific name for two genera of organisms and may refer to:

- Cyphochilus (beetle), a genus of insects in the family Scarabaeidae
- Cyphochilus (plant), a genus of plants in the family Orchidaceae
