= Eulepida anatina =

Scientific classification
- Kingdom: Animalia
- Phylum: Arthropoda
- Clade: Pancrustacea
- Class: Insecta
- Order: Coleoptera
- Suborder: Polyphaga
- Infraorder: Scarabaeiformia
- Family: Scarabaeidae
- Genus: Eulepida
- Species: E. anatina

Binomial name
- Eulepida anatina Brenske, 1896

Species of beetle

Eulepida anatina is a species of beetle of the family Scarabaeidae. It is found in Zimbabwe.

== Description ==
Adults reach a length of about 26–33 mm (1.0–1.3 in). They are very similar to Eulepida mashona. The clothing of scales is similar, but the scales are finer, less lanuginose, and either pure white or flavescent, the antennal club is flavescent, the elytra are more convex in the posterior part, somewhat narrower, and they have on each side two somewhat ill-defined rows of white scales set far apart, and often entirely wanting in females. The posterior half of the propygidium is not covered by the elytra, and the pygidium is very elongated in both sexes, but especially so in males. The scales on the abdomen are very minute, and the three basal abdominal segments have in the centre a very distinct, isolated patch of still smaller and whiter scales, and the hairs on the pectus are not squamose or lanceolate.
