= Chaetocosmetes sumatranus =

Scientific classification
- Kingdom: Animalia
- Phylum: Arthropoda
- Clade: Pancrustacea
- Class: Insecta
- Order: Coleoptera
- Suborder: Polyphaga
- Infraorder: Scarabaeiformia
- Family: Scarabaeidae
- Genus: Chaetocosmetes
- Species: C. sumatranus

Binomial name
- Chaetocosmetes sumatranus Moser, 1917

Species of beetle

Chaetocosmetes sumatranus is a species of beetle of the family Scarabaeidae. It is found in Indonesia (Sumatra).

== Description ==
Adults reach a length of about 9 mm (0.35 in). They are very similar to Chaetocosmetes javanus, although very different in the formation of the forceps. On the head and pronotum, the punctures are larger and somewhat more widely spaced. The lateral expansion of the pronotum is almost angular and before the posterior angles, the lateral margins are weakly but distinctly indented. The disc of the pronotum shows a smooth median longitudinal line posteriorly. On the elytra, the ribs are weaker and the punctures on the pygidium are closely spaced.
