= Eulepida tschindeana =

Scientific classification
- Kingdom: Animalia
- Phylum: Arthropoda
- Clade: Pancrustacea
- Class: Insecta
- Order: Coleoptera
- Suborder: Polyphaga
- Infraorder: Scarabaeiformia
- Family: Scarabaeidae
- Genus: Eulepida
- Species: E. tschindeana

Binomial name
- Eulepida tschindeana Péringuey, 1904

Species of beetle

Eulepida tschindeana is a species of beetle of the family Scarabaeidae. It is found in Mozambique and Zimbabwe.

== Description ==
Adults reach a length of about 27.5 mm (1.08 in). They are similar to Eulepida mashona in shape and size. The clypeus and the pygidium of the males are identical, but the squamose hairs on the upper and under parts are much finer, more closely set, and have therefore a less squamose appearance. Each elytron has four series of very conspicuous but somewhat remote white lanceolate scales irregularly geminate and less numerous on the first dorsal row, a few of these scales can also be detected along the suture, and the apical callus is moderately pubescent.
