= Eulepida manowensis =

Scientific classification
- Kingdom: Animalia
- Phylum: Arthropoda
- Clade: Pancrustacea
- Class: Insecta
- Order: Coleoptera
- Suborder: Polyphaga
- Infraorder: Scarabaeiformia
- Family: Scarabaeidae
- Genus: Eulepida
- Species: E. manowensis

Binomial name
- Eulepida manowensis Moser, 1913

Species of beetle

Eulepida manowensis is a species of beetle of the family Scarabaeidae. It is found in Tanzania.

== Description ==
Adults reach a length of about 27 mm. They are similar to Eulepida mashona, but scales on the upper surface are weaker throughout. The setae on the pygidium narrower. The thorax is likewise covered with yellowish hairs. The abdomen of E. mashona has narrow white scales on the sides, while in manowensis it has grey setae that are hardly scale-like.
