= Leucopholis pinguis =

Scientific classification
- Kingdom: Animalia
- Phylum: Arthropoda
- Clade: Pancrustacea
- Class: Insecta
- Order: Coleoptera
- Suborder: Polyphaga
- Infraorder: Scarabaeiformia
- Family: Scarabaeidae
- Tribe: Melolonthini
- Genus: Leucopholis
- Species: L. pinguis

Binomial name
- Leucopholis pinguis Burmeister, 1855

Species of beetle

Leucopholis pinguis is a species of scarab beetle found in Sri Lanka.

== Biology ==
Adults and grubs are known to attack many commercial plants such as Acacia decurrens, Cinnamomum camphora and Hevea brasiliensis. They mainly attack during vegetative growing stage of root and most common symptom is external feeding. Apart from that, grubs also attack nurseries of Cinnamomum zeylanicum.
