= Philacelota =

Scientific classification
- Kingdom: Animalia
- Phylum: Arthropoda
- Clade: Pancrustacea
- Class: Insecta
- Order: Coleoptera
- Suborder: Polyphaga
- Infraorder: Scarabaeiformia
- Family: Scarabaeidae
- Subfamily: Melolonthinae
- Tribe: Leucopholini
- Genus: Philacelota; Heller, 1900

Genus of beetles

Philacelota is a genus of beetles belonging to the family Scarabaeidae.

== Species ==
- Philacelota jakli Zídek, 2018
- Philacelota leucothea Prokofiev, 2019
- Philacelota maculosa (Brenske, 1896)
- Philacelota sulana Heller, 1900
