= Eulepida =

Scientific classification
- Kingdom: Animalia
- Phylum: Arthropoda
- Clade: Pancrustacea
- Class: Insecta
- Order: Coleoptera
- Suborder: Polyphaga
- Infraorder: Scarabaeiformia
- Family: Scarabaeidae
- Subfamily: Melolonthinae
- Tribe: Leucopholini
- Genus: Eulepida; Kolbe, 1894

Genus of leaf beetles

Eulepida is a genus of beetles belonging to the family Scarabaeidae.

== Species ==
- Eulepida anatina Brenske, 1896
- Eulepida baumanni Kolbe, 1894
- Eulepida delgadoensis Lacroix & Montreuil, 2017
- Eulepida flavovestita Moser, 1913
- Eulepida gracilipes Kolbe, 1894
- Eulepida kameruna (Frey, 1972)
- Eulepida kenyensis Lacroix, 2010
- Eulepida lepidota (Klug, 1855)
- Eulepida mamboiae Brenske, 1896
- Eulepida manowensis Moser, 1913
- Eulepida mashona Arrow, 1902
- Eulepida mayottensis Lacroix, 1989
- Eulepida mbala Sehnal, 2018
- Eulepida minor Moser, 1913
- Eulepida montana Kolbe, 1894
- Eulepida nitidicollis Kolbe, 1894
- Eulepida niveata Sehnal, 2018
- Eulepida nyassica Kolbe, 1894
- Eulepida reichei (Thomson, 1858)
- Eulepida savagei (Hope, 1842)
- Eulepida sinuatifrons (Fairmaire, 1887)
- Eulepida tschindeana Péringuey, 1904
- Eulepida werneri Lacroix, 2010
- Eulepida zambiensis Lacroix, 2010
