= Asactopholis tonkinensis =

Scientific classification
- Kingdom: Animalia
- Phylum: Arthropoda
- Clade: Pancrustacea
- Class: Insecta
- Order: Coleoptera
- Suborder: Polyphaga
- Infraorder: Scarabaeiformia
- Family: Scarabaeidae
- Genus: Asactopholis
- Species: A. tonkinensis

Binomial name
- Asactopholis tonkinensis (Moser, 1914)

Synonyms
- Empectida tonkinensis Moser, 1914

Species of beetle

Asactopholis tonkinensis is a species of beetle of the family Scarabaeidae. It is found in Laos, Thailand and Vietnam.

== Description ==
Adults reach a length of about 13–14 mm (0.51–0.55 in). They are blackish-brown, covered all over with whitish scales, and the elytra are reddish-brown. The head is wrinkled, its scales are lanceolate and the anterior margin of the clypeus is not emarginate. The pronotum is twice as wide as it is long, arched in the middle, the anterior and posterior angles are obtuse. The surface is weakly wrinkled-punctate, the scales are narrow on the disc, becoming slightly wider laterally. The scutellum is more densely scaled laterally than in the middle. The elytra show a distinct rib next to the lateral margins. They are somewhat wrinkled-punctate, the scales of the punctures being narrow in males, and oval in females. The pygidium is triangular with a rounded apex. It bears narrow scales in males, and weakly scale-like setae in females. The chest is sparsely covered with grey hairs, with some scales at the posterior corners.
