= Eulepida mamboiae =

Scientific classification
- Kingdom: Animalia
- Phylum: Arthropoda
- Clade: Pancrustacea
- Class: Insecta
- Order: Coleoptera
- Suborder: Polyphaga
- Infraorder: Scarabaeiformia
- Family: Scarabaeidae
- Genus: Eulepida
- Species: E. mamboiae

Binomial name
- Eulepida mamboiae Brenske, 1896

Synonyms
- Eulepida sororia Moser, 1913

Species of beetle

Eulepida mamboiae is a species of beetle of the family Scarabaeidae. It is found in Malawi and Tanzania.

== Description ==
Adults reach a length of about 28 mm.
