= Spaniolepis excavata =

Scientific classification
- Kingdom: Animalia
- Phylum: Arthropoda
- Clade: Pancrustacea
- Class: Insecta
- Order: Coleoptera
- Suborder: Polyphaga
- Infraorder: Scarabaeiformia
- Family: Scarabaeidae
- Genus: Spaniolepis
- Species: S. excavata

Binomial name
- Spaniolepis excavata Kolbe, 1894

Species of beetle

Spaniolepis excavata is a species of beetle of the family Scarabaeidae. It is found in Angola, the Democratic Republic of the Congo, the Republic of the Congo, Rwanda and Zambia.

== Description ==
Adults reach a length of about 27–31 mm (1.1–1.2 in). They are black or brownish-black, with little or no sheen. The elytra are chestnut brown. The scales are very small and singly arranged in the spots. A few larger, very narrow scales of yellow colour are located along the four ribs. The thorax is covered with grey hairs and scales along the sides.
