= Spaniolepis =

Scientific classification
- Kingdom: Animalia
- Phylum: Arthropoda
- Clade: Pancrustacea
- Class: Insecta
- Order: Coleoptera
- Suborder: Polyphaga
- Infraorder: Scarabaeiformia
- Family: Scarabaeidae
- Subfamily: Melolonthinae
- Tribe: Leucopholini
- Genus: Spaniolepis; Kolbe, 1894

Genus of leaf beetles

Spaniolepis is a genus of beetles belonging to the family Scarabaeidae.

== Species ==
- Spaniolepis agilis (Arrow, 1943)
- Spaniolepis excavata Kolbe, 1894
- Spaniolepis kivuensis Burgeon, 1946
- Spaniolepis leonina (Arrow, 1943)
