= Eulepida minor =

Scientific classification
- Kingdom: Animalia
- Phylum: Arthropoda
- Clade: Pancrustacea
- Class: Insecta
- Order: Coleoptera
- Suborder: Polyphaga
- Infraorder: Scarabaeiformia
- Family: Scarabaeidae
- Genus: Eulepida
- Species: E. minor

Binomial name
- Eulepida minor Moser, 1913

Species of beetle

Eulepida minor is a species of beetle of the family Scarabaeidae. It is found in Tanzania.

== Description ==
Adults reach a length of about 21–22 mm. They are similar to Eulepida sinuatifrons, but considerably smaller. The scales of the upper elytra are stronger and the elytra also have some larger white scales and a densely scaled area.
