= Leucopholis talaurensis =

Scientific classification
- Kingdom: Animalia
- Phylum: Arthropoda
- Clade: Pancrustacea
- Class: Insecta
- Order: Coleoptera
- Suborder: Polyphaga
- Infraorder: Scarabaeiformia
- Family: Scarabaeidae
- Tribe: Melolonthini
- Genus: Leucopholis
- Species: L. talaurensis

Binomial name
- Leucopholis talaurensis Moser, 1913

Species of beetle

Leucopholis talaurensis is a species of beetle of the family Scarabaeidae. It is found in Indonesia (Talaur Island.

== Description ==
Adults reach a length of about 32 mm (1.3 in). They are similar to Leucopholis celebensis. The scales on the upper surface are arranged in the same way as in that species, but the scales on the elytra are not round, but broadly ovate. The scales on the pygidium are similarly shaped to those in celebensis, but smaller. In the latter species, the sides of the thorax are quite densely covered with greyish-yellow hairs, and there are only a few scattered scales between these hairs. The base of the thoracic process is also hairy in celebensis. In talaurensis however, the sides of the thorax and the base of the thoracic process are scaled, and there are only a few thin hairs between the scales.
