= Pholidochris =

Scientific classification
- Kingdom: Animalia
- Phylum: Arthropoda
- Clade: Pancrustacea
- Class: Insecta
- Order: Coleoptera
- Suborder: Polyphaga
- Infraorder: Scarabaeiformia
- Family: Scarabaeidae
- Subfamily: Melolonthinae
- Tribe: Leucopholini
- Genus: Pholidochris; Kolbe, 1894

Genus of leaf beetles

Pholidochris is a genus of beetles belonging to the family Scarabaeidae.

== Species ==
- Pholidochris brenskei Kolbe, 1894
- Pholidochris dohrni (Quedenfeldt, 1884)
- Pholidochris helleri Brenske, 1903
- Pholidochris kolbei Brenske, 1898
- Pholidochris preussi Kolbe, 1894
- Pholidochris quedenfeldti (Brenske, 1892)
- Pholidochris sjoestedti Brenske, 1903
- Pholidochris sororia Moser, 1914
