= Pholidochris helleri =

Scientific classification
- Kingdom: Animalia
- Phylum: Arthropoda
- Clade: Pancrustacea
- Class: Insecta
- Order: Coleoptera
- Suborder: Polyphaga
- Infraorder: Scarabaeiformia
- Family: Scarabaeidae
- Genus: Pholidochris
- Species: P. helleri

Binomial name
- Pholidochris helleri Brenske, 1903

Species of beetle

Pholidochris helleri is a species of beetle of the family Scarabaeidae. It is found in Equatorial Guinea and the Republic of the Congo.

== Description ==
Adults reach a length of about 27 mm (1.1 in). They are brown, with a darker head and pronotum. In males, the pronotum is shagreened and densely punctate with short hairs, with the lateral margin weakly crenulate. The elytra are rugosely punctate with very faint costae. Each puncture contains a fine, short hair that is rarely longer than the puncture itself. The pygidium is densely and finely punctate, with very fine, short pubescence. In females, the pronotum is more hairy and the hairs are more robust, not only on the pronotum but also on the elytra and the pygidium. The latter is coarsely, rugosely punctate.
