= Afrolepis =

Scientific classification
- Kingdom: Animalia
- Phylum: Arthropoda
- Clade: Pancrustacea
- Class: Insecta
- Order: Coleoptera
- Suborder: Polyphaga
- Infraorder: Scarabaeiformia
- Family: Scarabaeidae
- Subfamily: Melolonthinae
- Tribe: Leucopholini
- Genus: Afrolepis; Decelle, 1968

Synonyms
- Oligolepis Kolbe, 1914

Genus of leaf beetles

Afrolepis is a genus of beetles belonging to the family Scarabaeidae.

== Species ==
- Afrolepis congoensis (Moser, 1913)
- Afrolepis ivorensis Decelle, 1968
- Afrolepis kivuensis Decelle, 1968
- Afrolepis pygidialis (Brenske, 1903)
- Afrolepis unguicularis (Brenske, 1903)
