= Chaetocosmetes =

Scientific classification
- Kingdom: Animalia
- Phylum: Arthropoda
- Clade: Pancrustacea
- Class: Insecta
- Order: Coleoptera
- Suborder: Polyphaga
- Infraorder: Scarabaeiformia
- Family: Scarabaeidae
- Subfamily: Melolonthinae
- Tribe: Leucopholini
- Genus: Chaetocosmetes; Moser, 1917

Genus of leaf beetles

Chaetocosmetes is a genus of beetles belonging to the family Scarabaeidae.

== Species ==
- Chaetocosmetes acutangulus (Arrow, 1938)
- Chaetocosmetes bilobiceps (Arrow, 1944)
- Chaetocosmetes capellus (Arrow, 1938)
- Chaetocosmetes chondropygus (Arrow, 1938)
- Chaetocosmetes cuniculus (Arrow, 1938)
- Chaetocosmetes felina (Arrow, 1938)
- Chaetocosmetes javanus Moser, 1917
- Chaetocosmetes mus (Arrow, 1938)
- Chaetocosmetes platypyga (Arrow, 1938)
- Chaetocosmetes sumatranus Moser, 1917
- Chaetocosmetes vethi Moser, 1917
