= Cochliotis kolbei =

Scientific classification
- Kingdom: Animalia
- Phylum: Arthropoda
- Clade: Pancrustacea
- Class: Insecta
- Order: Coleoptera
- Suborder: Polyphaga
- Infraorder: Scarabaeiformia
- Family: Scarabaeidae
- Genus: Cochliotis
- Species: C. kolbei

Binomial name
- Cochliotis kolbei Brenske, 1898

Species of beetle

Cochliotis kolbei is a species of beetle of the family Scarabaeidae. It is found in Tanzania.

== Description ==
Adults reach a length of about 22 mm (0.87 in). The clypeus is evenly covered with lanceolate scales. The pronotum is widest at the rear, with distinct hairs at the front, which are very short in the middle, the anterior margin slightly indented in the middle, the sides weakly notched, finely and sparsely punctate in the middle of the surface, much more densely punctate on the sides, densest in the right-angled hind corners, the scales are very minute and rounded in the middle, appearing as a white dot within the point, the scales are more distinct laterally, of an irregular oval shape, completely filling the depression. The scutellum is smooth at the apex. The scales of the elytra are somewhat stronger than those on the middle of the pronotum, but very fine and narrow, with a few slightly more distinct scales on the weakly indicated ribs. The pygidium is densely covered. These scales are fine, narrow, and as large as those of the scutellum.
