= Cochliotis =

Scientific classification
- Kingdom: Animalia
- Phylum: Arthropoda
- Clade: Pancrustacea
- Class: Insecta
- Order: Coleoptera
- Suborder: Polyphaga
- Infraorder: Scarabaeiformia
- Family: Scarabaeidae
- Subfamily: Melolonthinae
- Tribe: Leucopholini
- Genus: Cochliotis; Kolbe, 1894

Genus of leaf beetles

Cochliotis is a genus of beetles belonging to the family Scarabaeidae.

== Species ==
- Cochliotis kolbei Brenske, 1898
- Cochliotis melolonthoides (Gerstaecker, 1867)
- Cochliotis somaliensis Lacroix, 2009
