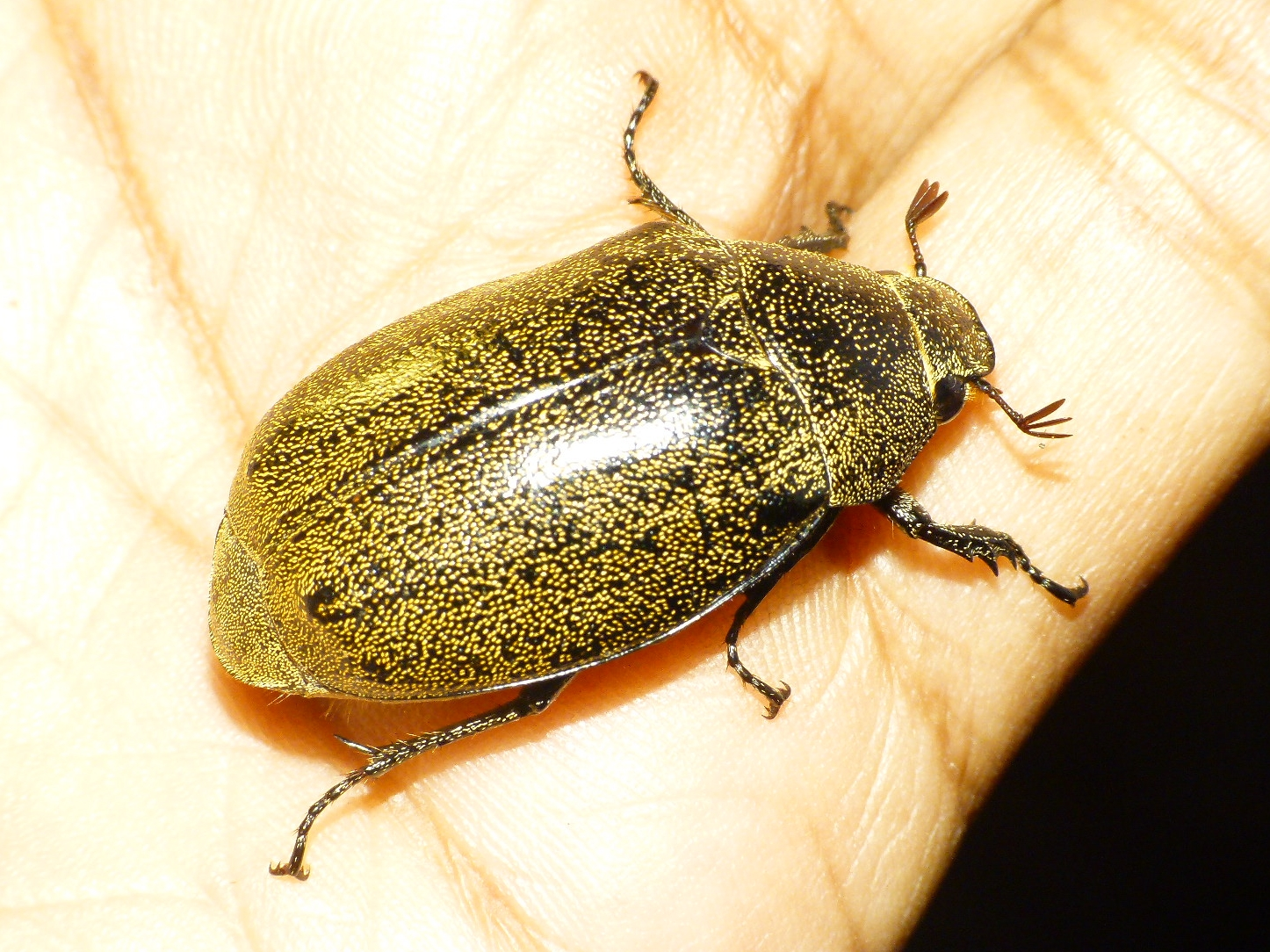
- Leucopholis lepidophora

Scientific classification
- Kingdom: Animalia
- Phylum: Arthropoda
- Clade: Pancrustacea
- Class: Insecta
- Order: Coleoptera
- Suborder: Polyphaga
- Infraorder: Scarabaeiformia
- Superfamily: Scarabaeoidea
- Family: Scarabaeidae
- Subfamily: Melolonthinae
- Tribe: Melolonthini
- Genus: Leucopholis; Dejean, 1833

= Leucopholis =

Genus of beetles

Leucopholis is a large genus of scarab beetles in the tribe Leucopholini.

== Species ==
- Leucopholis aberrans Sharp, 1876
- Leucopholis armata Sharp, 1876
- Leucopholis bakeri Moser, 1924
- Leucopholis bezdeki Calcetas, 2023
- Leucopholis brenskei Nonfried, 1906
- Leucopholis burmeisteri Brenske, 1894
- Leucopholis castelnaui Brenske, 1896
- Leucopholis celebensis Brenske, 1892
- Leucopholis cingulata Sharp, 1881
- Leucopholis coneophora Burmeister
- Leucopholis crassa Brenske, 1892
- Leucopholis cretacea Burmeister, 1855
- Leucopholis curvidens Brenske, 1896
- Leucopholis deplanata Moser, 1908
- Leucopholis elongata Brenske, 1892
- Leucopholis emarginata Burmeister, 1855
- Leucopholis fontainei Brenske, 1894
- Leucopholis guevarai Calcetas & Adorada, 2017
- Leucopholis helleri Brenske, 1896
- Leucopholis hirtiventris Frey, 1963
- Leucopholis horni Brenske, 1900
- Leucopholis insularis Brenske, 1896
- Leucopholis irrorata (Chevrolat, 1841)
- Leucopholis lepidophora Blanchard, 1851
- Leucopholis mirabilis Moser, 1908
- Leucopholis molitor Burmeister, 1855
- Leucopholis niasiana Brenske, 1893
- Leucopholis nigra Brenske, 1892
- Leucopholis nudiventris Burmeister, 1855
- Leucopholis nummicudens Newman, 1838
- Leucopholis palembangia Brenske, 1896
- Leucopholis pangiena Brenske, 1892
- Leucopholis peguana Moser, 1918
- Leucopholis pinguis Burmeister, 1855
- Leucopholis plagiata Blanchard, 1851
- Leucopholis pollens Sharp, 1876
- Leucopholis proxima Brenske, 1894
- Leucopholis pulverulenta Burmeister
- Leucopholis ratcliffei Calcetas, 2023
- Leucopholis reflexa Moser, 1924
- Leucopholis rorida (Fabricius, 1801)
- Leucopholis rufa Brenske, 1892
- Leucopholis schochi Brenske, 1894
- Leucopholis selenkana Brenske, 1896
- Leucopholis semperi Brenske, 1896
- Leucopholis shangirana Brenske, 1894
- Leucopholis sharpi Brenske, 1896
- Leucopholis stainesi Calcetas, 2023
- Leucopholis staudingeri Brenske, 1892
- Leucopholis sumatrensis Brenske, 1892
- Leucopholis talaurensis Moser, 1913
- Leucopholis tetaranus Brenske, 1896
- Leucopholis tristicula Brenske, 1896
- Leucopholis tristis Brenske, 1892
