= Asthenopholis ugandensis =

Scientific classification
- Kingdom: Animalia
- Phylum: Arthropoda
- Clade: Pancrustacea
- Class: Insecta
- Order: Coleoptera
- Suborder: Polyphaga
- Infraorder: Scarabaeiformia
- Family: Scarabaeidae
- Genus: Asthenopholis
- Species: A. ugandensis

Binomial name
- Asthenopholis ugandensis Moser, 1913

Species of beetle

Asthenopholis ugandensis is a species of beetle of the family Scarabaeidae. It is found in Kenya, Tanzania and Uganda.

== Description ==
Adults reach a length of about 18–19.5 mm (0.71–0.77 in) for males and 19–20 mm (0.75–0.79 in) for females. The upper surface is black and shiny, with yellowish-white scales. The head is punctate, with the punctures strongly bristled and the antennae are brown, with a lighter club. The punctation of the pronotum is coarse and dense, the scales of the punctures are oblong-ovate or elliptical. The elytra show only very indistinct ribs. They are sparsely punctate, the punctures with elongate scales that are somewhat pointed at the end.
