= Eulepida delgadoensis =

Scientific classification
- Kingdom: Animalia
- Phylum: Arthropoda
- Clade: Pancrustacea
- Class: Insecta
- Order: Coleoptera
- Suborder: Polyphaga
- Infraorder: Scarabaeiformia
- Family: Scarabaeidae
- Genus: Eulepida
- Species: E. delgadoensis

Binomial name
- Eulepida delgadoensis Lacroix & Montreuil, 2017

Species of beetle

Eulepida delgadoensis is a species of beetle of the family Scarabaeidae. It is found in Mozambique.

== Description ==
Adults reach a length of about 26 mm (1.0 in). They have a rather elongated, fusiform body. The upper surface is covered with fine, dense, yellowish, scaly hairs.

== Etymology ==
The species is named after the Cabo Delgado, a province of Mozambique.
