= Eulepida nitidicollis =

Scientific classification
- Kingdom: Animalia
- Phylum: Arthropoda
- Clade: Pancrustacea
- Class: Insecta
- Order: Coleoptera
- Suborder: Polyphaga
- Infraorder: Scarabaeiformia
- Family: Scarabaeidae
- Genus: Eulepida
- Species: E. nitidicollis

Binomial name
- Eulepida nitidicollis Kolbe, 1894

Synonyms
- Eulepida kolbei Moser, 1913

Species of beetle

Eulepida nitidicollis is a species of beetle of the family Scarabaeidae. It is found in Mozambique and Tanzania.

== Description ==
Adults reach a length of about 28 mm. They are similar to Eulepida sinuatifrons, but the scales on the pronotum and elytra are significantly broader, particularly on the pronotum and also strongly pointed at the apex. The larger white scales on the elytra are also somewhat narrower.
