= Asthenopholis adspersa =

Scientific classification
- Kingdom: Animalia
- Phylum: Arthropoda
- Clade: Pancrustacea
- Class: Insecta
- Order: Coleoptera
- Suborder: Polyphaga
- Infraorder: Scarabaeiformia
- Family: Scarabaeidae
- Genus: Asthenopholis
- Species: A. adspersa

Binomial name
- Asthenopholis adspersa (Boheman, 1857)

Synonyms
- Ancylonycha adspersa Boheman, 1857; Hoplochelus adspersus; Asthenopholis transvaalensis Brenske, 1898

Species of beetle

Asthenopholis adspersa is a species of beetle of the family Scarabaeidae. It is found in South Africa (KwaZulu-Natal).

== Description ==
Adults reach a length of about 20–25 mm (0.79–0.98 in) for males and 21–24 mm (0.83–0.94 in) for females. They are brown to black, with the cuticle covered by white scales. The scutellum is smooth and lacks any punctation or setae.
