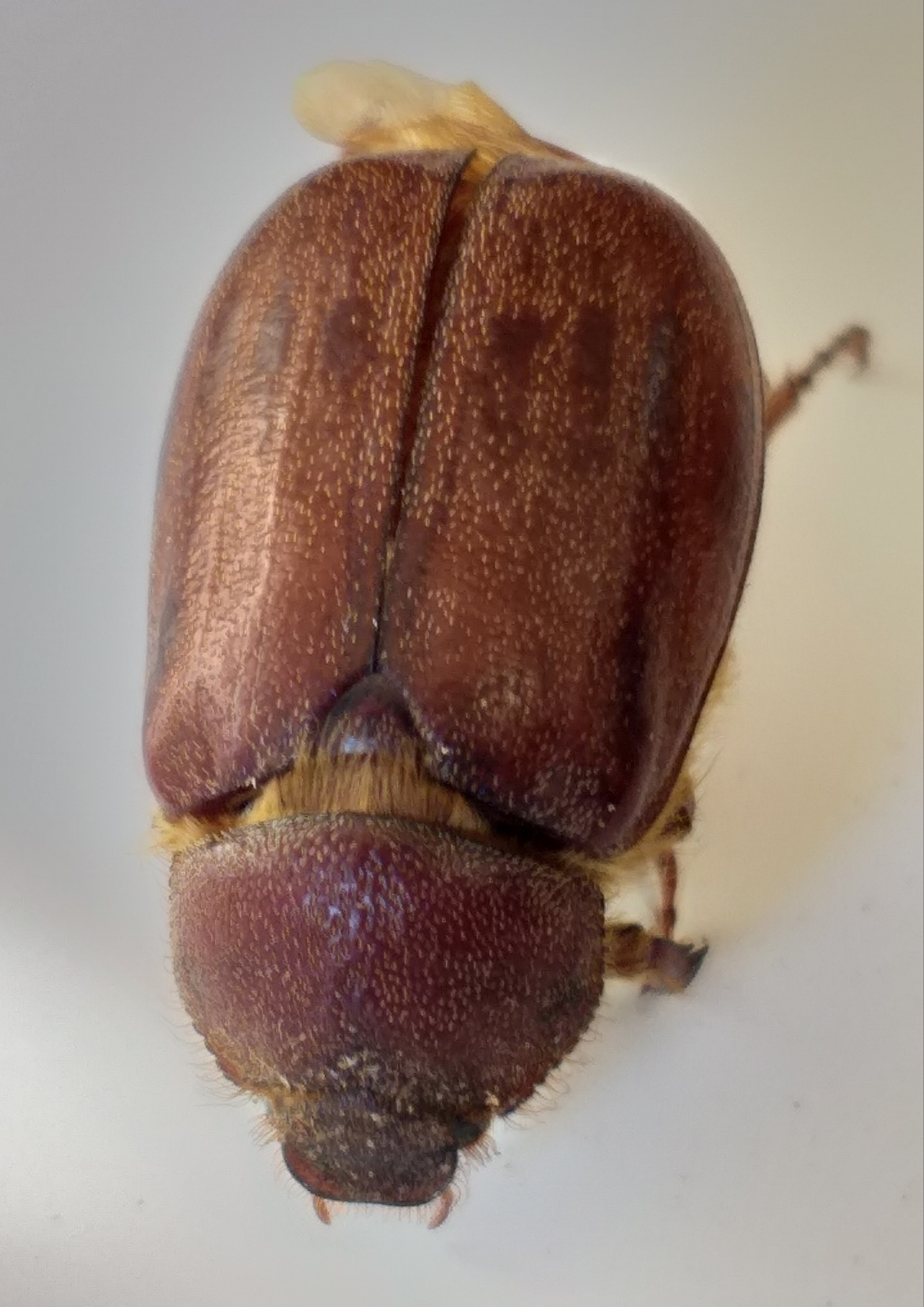

Scientific classification
- Kingdom: Animalia
- Phylum: Arthropoda
- Clade: Pancrustacea
- Class: Insecta
- Order: Coleoptera
- Suborder: Polyphaga
- Infraorder: Scarabaeiformia
- Family: Scarabaeidae
- Genus: Asthenopholis
- Species: A. subfasciata

Binomial name
- Asthenopholis subfasciata (Blanchard, 1851)

Synonyms
- Ancylonycha subfasciata Blanchard, 1851; Hoplochelus subfasciatus; Ancylonycha dasypus Burmeister, 1855; Asthenopholis dasypus; Hoplochelus dasypus

= Asthenopholis subfasciata =

Species of beetle

Asthenopholis subfasciata is a species of beetle of the family Scarabaeidae. It is found in South Africa (Eastern Cape, Western Cape).

== Description ==
Adults reach a length of about 17–19 mm (0.67–0.75 in) for males and 18–21 mm (0.71–0.83 in) for females. They are chestnut brown with very fine setae on the scutellum, pronotum and elytra.

== Life history ==
The larvae are an important pest of pineapple. They feed on the roots and boring into the stumps of their host plant.
