= Brachylepis werneri =

Scientific classification
- Kingdom: Animalia
- Phylum: Arthropoda
- Clade: Pancrustacea
- Class: Insecta
- Order: Coleoptera
- Suborder: Polyphaga
- Infraorder: Scarabaeiformia
- Family: Scarabaeidae
- Genus: Brachylepis
- Species: B. werneri

Binomial name
- Brachylepis werneri Lacroix, 2009

Species of beetle

Brachylepis werneri is a species of beetle of the family Scarabaeidae. It is found in Ethiopia and Tanzania.

== Description ==
Adults reach a length of about 31.8 mm (1.25 in).
