= Byrsalepis =

Scientific classification
- Kingdom: Animalia
- Phylum: Arthropoda
- Clade: Pancrustacea
- Class: Insecta
- Order: Coleoptera
- Suborder: Polyphaga
- Infraorder: Scarabaeiformia
- Family: Scarabaeidae
- Subfamily: Melolonthinae
- Tribe: Leucopholini
- Genus: Byrsalepis; Brenske, 1898

Genus of leaf beetles

Byrsalepis is a genus of beetles belonging to the family Scarabaeidae.

== Species ==
- Byrsalepis mikindana Brenske, 1898
- Byrsalepis nyassica Brenske, 1898
- Byrsalepis rhodesiana Arrow, 1943
