= Asthenopholis rex =

Scientific classification
- Kingdom: Animalia
- Phylum: Arthropoda
- Clade: Pancrustacea
- Class: Insecta
- Order: Coleoptera
- Suborder: Polyphaga
- Infraorder: Scarabaeiformia
- Family: Scarabaeidae
- Genus: Asthenopholis
- Species: A. rex

Binomial name
- Asthenopholis rex Harrison, 2009

Species of beetle

Asthenopholis rex is a species of beetle of the family Scarabaeidae. It is found in South Africa (KwaZulu-Natal).

== Description ==
Adults reach a length of about 24–25 mm (0.94–0.98 in). They are brown to black, with straw coloured cuticular scales. The scutellum is smooth and lacks any punctation or setae.

== Etymology ==
The species name is derived from Latin rex (meaning king) and refers to its large size.
