= Brachylepis =

Scientific classification
- Kingdom: Animalia
- Phylum: Arthropoda
- Clade: Pancrustacea
- Class: Insecta
- Order: Coleoptera
- Suborder: Polyphaga
- Infraorder: Scarabaeiformia
- Family: Scarabaeidae
- Subfamily: Melolonthinae
- Tribe: Leucopholini
- Genus: Brachylepis; Kolbe, 1894

Genus of leaf beetles

Brachylepis is a genus of beetles belonging to the family Scarabaeidae.

== Species ==
- Brachylepis elephas (Gerstaecker, 1867)
- Brachylepis turmensis Sehnal, 2018
- Brachylepis werneri Lacroix, 2009
