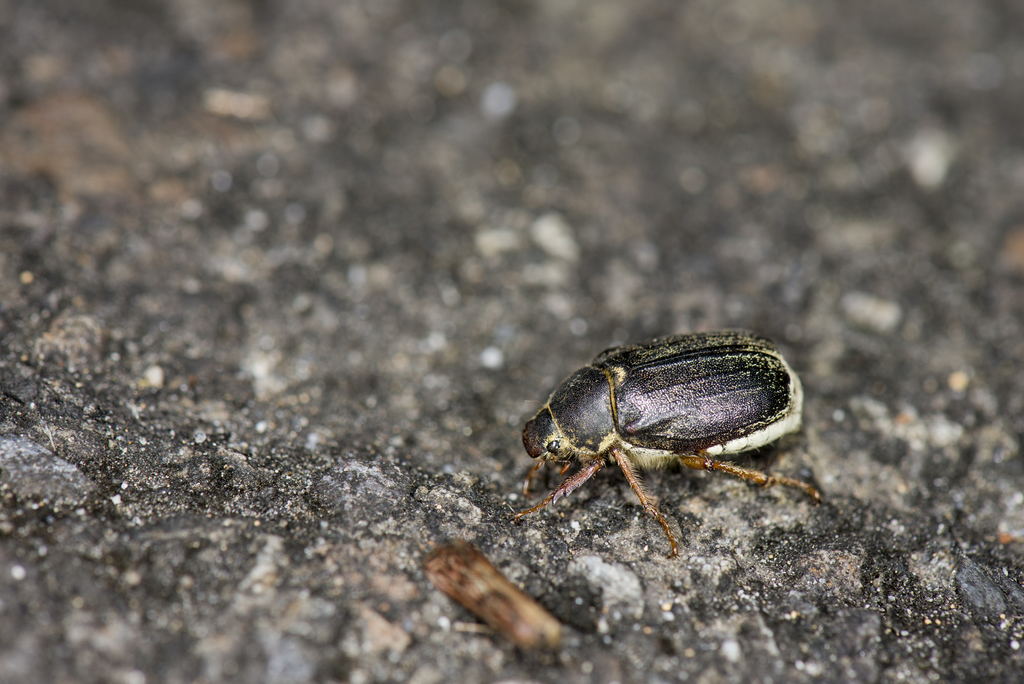

Scientific classification
- Kingdom: Animalia
- Phylum: Arthropoda
- Clade: Pancrustacea
- Class: Insecta
- Order: Coleoptera
- Suborder: Polyphaga
- Infraorder: Scarabaeiformia
- Family: Scarabaeidae
- Genus: Dasylepida
- Species: D. nana

Binomial name
- Dasylepida nana (Sharp, 1876)

Synonyms
- Lepidiota nana Sharp, 1876; Dasylepida fissa Moser, 1913

= Dasylepida nana =

Species of beetle

Dasylepida nana is a species of beetle of the family Scarabaeidae. It is found in China (Zhejiang) and Taiwan.

== Description ==
Adults reach a length of about 17 mm (0.67 in). They are black, with the antennae and legs brown. The head is robustly, weakly, and wrinkledly punctured, with the punctures bearing short yellow setae. The punctures on the pronotum are rather coarse and dense, with an indistinct, smooth midline in the posterior half. The yellow setae of the punctures are somewhat longer at the sides. The scutellum is also densely punctured and covered with yellow setae. The punctures on the weakly wrinkled elytra are coarse, each puncture bearing a small, long, pointed bristle. In front of the posterior margin is a transverse band of rather densely spaced, scale-like yellow setae. Each elytron shows five ribs, including the indentation of the sutural rib, but the fourth is very indistinct. The pygidium is densely covered with narrow, lanceolate scales and with long, erect hairs. The chest bears dense yellow hairs, and the abdomen is uniformly covered with yellow scales, with the scales being ovate or lanceolate.
