= Brachylepis elephas =

Scientific classification
- Kingdom: Animalia
- Phylum: Arthropoda
- Clade: Pancrustacea
- Class: Insecta
- Order: Coleoptera
- Suborder: Polyphaga
- Infraorder: Scarabaeiformia
- Family: Scarabaeidae
- Genus: Brachylepis
- Species: B. elephas

Binomial name
- Brachylepis elephas (Gerstaecker, 1867)

Synonyms
- Coniopholis elephas Gerstaecker, 1867; Brachylepis hauseri Péringuey, 1904; Brachylepis bennigseni Brenske, 1898

Species of beetle

Brachylepis elephas is a species of beetle of the family Scarabaeidae. It is found in Kenya, the Democratic Republic of the Congo and Tanzania.

== Description ==
Adults reach a length of about 27 mm (1.1 in). They are fuscous-black, with the antennae chestnut-red. The head and pronotum are covered with contiguous sub-flavescent scales hiding completely the background of the pronotum, but slightly less dense on the head. The scutellum is scaly and the elytra have faint traces of two or three costules and the surface is deeply punctate, the punctures being only moderately closely set and filled each with a greyish-white scale. The propygidium is extremely closely punctulate and very briefly pubescent, while the pygidium is covered with contiguous sub-flavescent scales.
