= Asactopholis sericea =

Scientific classification
- Kingdom: Animalia
- Phylum: Arthropoda
- Clade: Pancrustacea
- Class: Insecta
- Order: Coleoptera
- Suborder: Polyphaga
- Infraorder: Scarabaeiformia
- Family: Scarabaeidae
- Genus: Asactopholis
- Species: A. sericea

Binomial name
- Asactopholis sericea Moser, 1913

Species of beetle

Asactopholis sericea is a species of beetle of the family Scarabaeidae. It is found in Malaysia (Sabah).

== Description ==
Adults reach a length of about 20 mm (0.79 in). They are similar to Asactopholis opalinea, but distinguished by the different punctation of the elytra and the formation of the pygidium. The head is widely spaced, the clypeus somewhat more densely punctate, and the punctures bear egg-shaped or elliptical yellow scales. The anterior margin of the clypeus is slightly upturned, with a barely perceptible indentation in the middle. The punctation of the pronotum is moderately dense, the scales are egg-shaped. In the posterior half, an indistinct, smooth median line is marked. On the elytra, the punctures are very irregular, sometimes widely spaced, sometimes quite closely grouped. The scales of the punctures are very small and egg-shaped. The ribs are distinguished only by the fact that they are almost unpunctate and bear occasional large, egg-shaped scales. The flat apical humps are black. The pygidium is also irregularly punctate and has egg-shaped scales at the points. The posterior margin of the pygidium is truncate and shallowly emarginate. The thorax is covered with yellowish hairs, the abdomen with grey scales, widely spaced in the middle, somewhat narrower at the sides. The scales are egg-shaped or elliptical.
