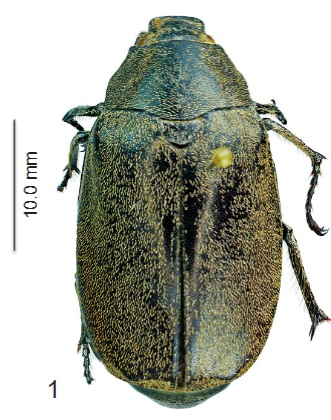

Scientific classification
- Kingdom: Animalia
- Phylum: Arthropoda
- Clade: Pancrustacea
- Class: Insecta
- Order: Coleoptera
- Suborder: Polyphaga
- Infraorder: Scarabaeiformia
- Family: Scarabaeidae
- Tribe: Melolonthini
- Genus: Leucopholis
- Species: L. stainesi

Binomial name
- Leucopholis stainesi Calcetas, 2023

= Leucopholis stainesi =

Species of beetle

Leucopholis stainesi is a species of beetle of the family Scarabaeidae. It is found in the Philippines (Mindanao).

== Description ==
Adults reach a length of about 35 mm. The dorsum is dichromatic and the head, pronotum, scutellum, elytra and legs are blackish, with a brownish tinge on the posterior margin of the elytra. The body covered with yellowish white scales. The venter is dichromatic blackish with little shade of brown.

== Etymology ==
The species is named is named in honour of Dr Charles Staines, world expert on hispines at the Smithsonian Environmental Research Center, Edgewater, Maryland, USA.
