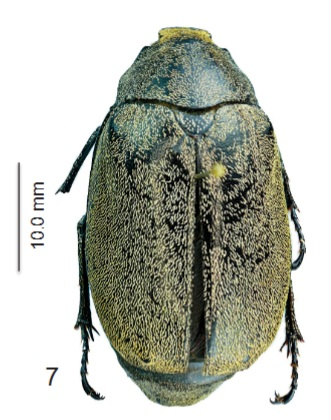

Scientific classification
- Kingdom: Animalia
- Phylum: Arthropoda
- Clade: Pancrustacea
- Class: Insecta
- Order: Coleoptera
- Suborder: Polyphaga
- Infraorder: Scarabaeiformia
- Family: Scarabaeidae
- Tribe: Melolonthini
- Genus: Leucopholis
- Species: L. bezdeki

Binomial name
- Leucopholis bezdeki Calcetas, 2023

= Leucopholis bezdeki =

Species of beetle

Leucopholis bezdeki is a species of beetle of the family Scarabaeidae. It is found in the Philippines (Mindanao).

== Description ==
Adults reach a length of about 38.2 mm. The dorsum and venter are monochromatic black, covered with yellowish white scales.

== Etymology ==
The species is named is named in honour of Dr Aleš Bezděk (Biology Centre CAS, České Budějovice, Czech Republic), a specialist on Asian melolonthines.
