= Brachylepis turmensis =

Scientific classification
- Kingdom: Animalia
- Phylum: Arthropoda
- Clade: Pancrustacea
- Class: Insecta
- Order: Coleoptera
- Suborder: Polyphaga
- Infraorder: Scarabaeiformia
- Family: Scarabaeidae
- Genus: Brachylepis
- Species: B. turmensis

Binomial name
- Brachylepis turmensis Sehnal, 2018

Species of beetle

Brachylepis turmensis is a species of beetle of the family Scarabaeidae. It is found in Ethiopia.

== Description ==
Adults reach a length of about 24.5 mm (0.96 in). They have an elongate, posteriorly slightly dilated body. The dorsal surface and abdomen are dark brown, the legs partly lighter, the antennae bicolorous and the elytra pruinose.

== Etymology ==
The species name is derived from the name of the type locality, Turmi.
