= Philacelota jakli =

Scientific classification
- Kingdom: Animalia
- Phylum: Arthropoda
- Clade: Pancrustacea
- Class: Insecta
- Order: Coleoptera
- Suborder: Polyphaga
- Infraorder: Scarabaeiformia
- Family: Scarabaeidae
- Genus: Philacelota
- Species: P. jakli

Binomial name
- Philacelota jakli Zídek, 2018

Species of beetle

Philacelota jakli is a species of beetle of the family Scarabaeidae. It is found in Indonesia (Flores).

== Description ==
Adults reach a length of about 14 mm (0.55 in). They are brownish-black, with the lateral margins of the pronotum and elytra, mouthparts, prothorax, abdomen and legs dark brown and the antennae light brown. The body is mostly covered by whitish setae, but there are brownish-yellow hairs on the prosternum and metasternum.

== Etymology ==
The species is named for the Czech entomologist Stanislav Jákl, who collected the type series.
