= Leucopholis peguana =

Scientific classification
- Kingdom: Animalia
- Phylum: Arthropoda
- Clade: Pancrustacea
- Class: Insecta
- Order: Coleoptera
- Suborder: Polyphaga
- Infraorder: Scarabaeiformia
- Family: Scarabaeidae
- Tribe: Melolonthini
- Genus: Leucopholis
- Species: L. peguana

Binomial name
- Leucopholis peguana Moser, 1918

Species of beetle

Leucopholis peguana is a species of beetle of the family Scarabaeidae. It is found in Myanmar.

== Description ==
Adults reach a length of about 32–37 mm. They are brown or blackish-brown and shiny, with yellowish scales. The antennae are reddish-brown. On the pronotum, the scales are quite widely spaced in the middle, becoming more closer towards the sides. The scales are small and rounded. The elytra are moderately densely covered with ovate scales, becoming more closely spaced in front of the posterior margin. The underside is extensively scaled in the middle, while the middle of the thorax is almost smooth. The sides of the thorax have fine hairs and elongated scales, while the sides of the abdomen are densely covered with broad, egg-shaped scales.
