= Dasylepida =

Scientific classification
- Kingdom: Animalia
- Phylum: Arthropoda
- Clade: Pancrustacea
- Class: Insecta
- Order: Coleoptera
- Suborder: Polyphaga
- Infraorder: Scarabaeiformia
- Family: Scarabaeidae
- Subfamily: Melolonthinae
- Tribe: Leucopholini
- Genus: Dasylepida; Moser, 1913

Genus of beetles

Dasylepida is a genus of beetles belonging to the family Scarabaeidae.

== Species ==
- subgenus Dasylepida
  - Dasylepida costata (Nonfried, 1891)
  - Dasylepida ernstbrenskei Prokofiev, 2025
  - Dasylepida gononii (Fairmaire, 1897)
  - Dasylepida ishigakiensis (Niijima & Kinoshita, 1927)
  - Dasylepida nana (Sharp, 1876)
  - Dasylepida obscurata (Fairmaire, 1878)
  - Dasylepida rudepunctata (Moser, 1908)
  - Dasylepida testaceipes (Fairmaire, 1902)
- subgenus Lepipusia Prokofiev, 2025
  - Dasylepida latericostata (Fairmaire, 1888)
  - Dasylepida lepida (Kirsch, 1875)
  - Dasylepida oberndorferi (Brenske, 1892)
  - Dasylepida pumila (Sharp, 1876)
