= Eulepida flavovestita =

Scientific classification
- Kingdom: Animalia
- Phylum: Arthropoda
- Clade: Pancrustacea
- Class: Insecta
- Order: Coleoptera
- Suborder: Polyphaga
- Infraorder: Scarabaeiformia
- Family: Scarabaeidae
- Genus: Eulepida
- Species: E. flavovestita

Binomial name
- Eulepida flavovestita Moser, 1913

Species of beetle

Eulepida flavovestita is a species of beetle of the family Scarabaeidae. It is found in Liberia.

== Description ==
Adults reach a length of about 30 mm. They are similar to Eulepida reichei, but can be easily distinguished by the larger, interspersed white scales on the elytra. The head is coarsely punctate and covered with erect yellow setae. The pronotum is densely punctate with yellow and bristle-like scales.
