= Philacelota sulana =

Scientific classification
- Kingdom: Animalia
- Phylum: Arthropoda
- Clade: Pancrustacea
- Class: Insecta
- Order: Coleoptera
- Suborder: Polyphaga
- Infraorder: Scarabaeiformia
- Family: Scarabaeidae
- Genus: Philacelota
- Species: P. sulana

Binomial name
- Philacelota sulana Heller, 1900

Species of beetle

Philacelota sulana is a species of beetle of the family Scarabaeidae. It is found in Indonesia (Sulawesi).

== Description ==
Adults reach a length of about 15 mm (0.59 in) for males and 20 mm (0.79 in) for females. The hairs have the form of short whitish setae, which are denser on the disc of the pronotum and abdominal ventrites. On the elytra, they are sparse and only found on the lighter brown areas of the intervals.
