= Philacelota leucothea =

- A: male; B: female

Scientific classification
- Kingdom: Animalia
- Phylum: Arthropoda
- Clade: Pancrustacea
- Class: Insecta
- Order: Coleoptera
- Suborder: Polyphaga
- Infraorder: Scarabaeiformia
- Family: Scarabaeidae
- Genus: Philacelota
- Species: P. leucothea

Binomial name
- Philacelota leucothea Prokofiev, 2019

Species of beetle

Philacelota leucothea is a species of beetle of the family Scarabaeidae. It is found in the Philippines (Luzon).

== Description ==
Adults reach a length of about 14–15 mm (0.55–0.59 in) for males and 16–17 mm (0.63–0.67 in) for females. They are reddish-brown, with the scales and pilosity whitish.

== Etymology ==
The name of the species reflects the white scale covering of the beetles. Leucothea (meaning white goddess) is a poetic epithet of a Greek goddess.
