= Philgertia =

Scientific classification
- Kingdom: Animalia
- Phylum: Arthropoda
- Clade: Pancrustacea
- Class: Insecta
- Order: Coleoptera
- Suborder: Polyphaga
- Infraorder: Scarabaeiformia
- Family: Scarabaeidae
- Subfamily: Melolonthinae
- Tribe: Leucopholini
- Genus: Philgertia; Zídek, 2021
- Species: P. lii

Binomial name
- Philgertia lii (Keith, 2006)

Synonyms
- Engertia lii Keith, 2006

Genus of beetles

Philgertia is a genus of beetle of the family Scarabaeidae. It is monotypic, being represented by the single species, Philgertia lii, which is found in the Philippines (Leyte, Kabeng, Palawan, Mindanao).

== Description ==
They are light to dark brown with chalk white oval and lanceolate scales, as well as greyish-white and yellowish setae and hairs.
