= Engertia =

Scientific classification
- Kingdom: Animalia
- Phylum: Arthropoda
- Clade: Pancrustacea
- Class: Insecta
- Order: Coleoptera
- Suborder: Polyphaga
- Infraorder: Scarabaeiformia
- Family: Scarabaeidae
- Subfamily: Melolonthinae
- Tribe: Leucopholini
- Genus: Engertia; Dalla Torre, 1912

Synonyms
- Phila Brenske, 1897

Genus of leaf beetles

Engertia is a genus of beetles belonging to the family Scarabaeidae.

== Species ==
- Engertia amboinae (Brenske, 1897)
- Engertia setifera (Moser, 1913)
