= Afrolepis congoensis =

Scientific classification
- Kingdom: Animalia
- Phylum: Arthropoda
- Clade: Pancrustacea
- Class: Insecta
- Order: Coleoptera
- Suborder: Polyphaga
- Infraorder: Scarabaeiformia
- Family: Scarabaeidae
- Genus: Afrolepis
- Species: A. congoensis

Binomial name
- Afrolepis congoensis (Moser, 1913)

Synonyms
- Oligolepis congoensis Moser, 1913

Species of beetle

Afrolepis congoensis is a species of beetle of the family Scarabaeidae. It is found in Gabon, the Democratic Republic of the Congo and the Republic of the Congo.

== Description ==
Adults reach a length of about 20 mm. The upper surface is shiny and they are blackish-brown, but black on the disc of the pronotum. The elytra are yellowish-brown, and the scales are pale yellow. The head, with the exception of a longitudinal band on the frons, is covered with large scales. The antennae are brown. The pronotum is extensively covered with rounded scales. Between the center and the side edge, on each side, runs a longitudinal band formed from large, closely spaced scales. Within these bands, on each side of the middle, is a longitudinal spot, also composed of closely spaced scales. The elytra show only faint indications of ribs. They are moderately densely punctate, with the punctures being closer together only immediately at the base. The punctures have small, broadly oval scales.
