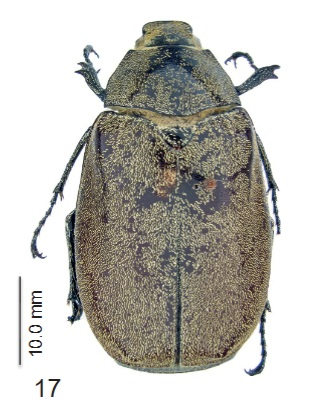

Scientific classification
- Kingdom: Animalia
- Phylum: Arthropoda
- Clade: Pancrustacea
- Class: Insecta
- Order: Coleoptera
- Suborder: Polyphaga
- Infraorder: Scarabaeiformia
- Family: Scarabaeidae
- Tribe: Melolonthini
- Genus: Leucopholis
- Species: L. ratcliffei

Binomial name
- Leucopholis ratcliffei Calcetas, 2023

= Leucopholis ratcliffei =

Species of beetle

Leucopholis ratcliffei is a species of beetle of the family Scarabaeidae. It is found in the Philippines (Mindanao).

== Description ==
Adults reach a length of about 42.5 mm. The dorsum is dichromatic and the head, pronotum, scutellum and legs are black to blackish brown. The elytra and abdomen are dark reddish brown to brownish. The venter is monochromatic brown.

== Etymology ==
The species is named is named in honour of Dr Brett Ratcliffe, Curator of Insects at the University of Nebraska State Museum and a professor in the Department of Entomology. He is a specialist in the taxonomy, biology, ecology, and biogeography of scarab beetles, especially those of the Neotropics.
