= Leucopholis hirtiventris =

Scientific classification
- Kingdom: Animalia
- Phylum: Arthropoda
- Clade: Pancrustacea
- Class: Insecta
- Order: Coleoptera
- Suborder: Polyphaga
- Infraorder: Scarabaeiformia
- Family: Scarabaeidae
- Tribe: Melolonthini
- Genus: Leucopholis
- Species: L. hirtiventris

Binomial name
- Leucopholis hirtiventris Frey, 1963

Species of beetle

Leucopholis hirtiventris is a species of beetle of the family Scarabaeidae. It is found in the Philippines.

== Description ==
Adults reach a length of about 21–23 mm. The upper and lower surfaces are reddish-brown. The entire upper surface is densely covered with whitish, lanceolate scales, leaving only a few areas free on the elytra and pronotum. On the pronotum and especially on the head, the scales are even longer than on the elytra and on the head, they are very densely packed and almost resemble bristle-like scales. The thorax is very densely covered with long, off-white hairs.
