= Camerunopholis kameruna =

Scientific classification
- Kingdom: Animalia
- Phylum: Arthropoda
- Clade: Pancrustacea
- Class: Insecta
- Order: Coleoptera
- Suborder: Polyphaga
- Infraorder: Scarabaeiformia
- Family: Scarabaeidae
- Genus: Camerunopholis
- Species: C. kameruna

Binomial name
- Camerunopholis kameruna (Moser, 1913)

Synonyms
- Spaniolepis kameruna Moser, 1913; Camerunopholis mirifica Lacroix, 2002

Species of beetle

Camerunopholis kameruna is a species of beetle of the family Scarabaeidae. It is found in Cameroon.

== Description ==
Adults reach a length of about 30 mm. The head is black, the elytra are blackish-brown and the upper surface has a silky sheen. The head is strongly but not densely punctate. The pronotum is rather sparsely punctate, the punctures with minute setae. The ribs on the elytra are only very faintly discernible. They are moderately densely punctate and have minute setae. Isolated larger yellow scales, located particularly at the ribs, are elliptical.
