= Camerunopholis =

Scientific classification
- Kingdom: Animalia
- Phylum: Arthropoda
- Clade: Pancrustacea
- Class: Insecta
- Order: Coleoptera
- Suborder: Polyphaga
- Infraorder: Scarabaeiformia
- Family: Scarabaeidae
- Subfamily: Melolonthinae
- Tribe: Leucopholini
- Genus: Camerunopholis; Lacroix, 2002

Genus of leaf beetles

Camerunopholis is a genus of beetles belonging to the family Scarabaeidae.

== Species ==
- Camerunopholis congoensis Lacroix & Montreuil, 2019
- Camerunopholis kameruna (Moser, 1913)
