= Leucopholini =

Scientific classification
- Kingdom: Animalia
- Phylum: Arthropoda
- Clade: Pancrustacea
- Class: Insecta
- Order: Coleoptera
- Suborder: Polyphaga
- Infraorder: Scarabaeiformia
- Family: Scarabaeidae
- Subfamily: Melolonthinae
- Tribe: Leucopholini; Burmeister, 1855

Tribe of beetles

Leucopholini is a tribe of scarab beetles in the family Scarabaeidae.

== Genera ==
The following genera are recognised in the tribe Leucopholini:

- Afrolepis Decelle, 1968
- Asactopholis Brenske, 1894
- Asthenopholis Brenske, 1898
- Brachylepis Kolbe, 1894
- Byrsalepis Brenske, 1898
- Camerunopholis Lacroix, 2002
- Chaetocosmetes Moser, 1917
- Cochliotis Kolbe, 1894
- Cyphochilus Waterhouse, 1867
- Dasylepida Moser, 1913
- Dedalopterus Sabatinelli & Pontuale, 1998
- Engertia Dalla Torre, 1912
- Eulepida Kolbe, 1894
- Eulepidopsis Burgeon, 1946
- Exopholis Motschulsky, 1859
- Graviengertia Prokofiev, 2016
- Kenyalepis Lacroix, 2011
- Kuenckeliana Lacroix, 1989
- Lacroixilepis Keith, 2007
- Lepidiota Kirby, 1828
- Lepidomela Kolbe, 1894
- Leucopholis Dejean, 1833
- Leucophorus Brenske, 1894
- Malaisius Arrow, 1941
- Melolonthoides Dewailly, 1950
- Philacelota Heller, 1900
- Philgertia Zídek, 2021
- Pholidochris Kolbe, 1894
- Proagosternus Blanchard, 1851
- Pseudopholis Duvivier, 1892
- Rhabdopholis Burmeister, 1855
- Spaniolepis Kolbe, 1894
- Tanzanilepis Lacroix, 2008
- Terebrogaster Lacroix, 1989
- Tricholepis Blanchard, 1851
