= Asactopholis =

Scientific classification
- Kingdom: Animalia
- Phylum: Arthropoda
- Clade: Pancrustacea
- Class: Insecta
- Order: Coleoptera
- Suborder: Polyphaga
- Infraorder: Scarabaeiformia
- Family: Scarabaeidae
- Subfamily: Melolonthinae
- Tribe: Leucopholini
- Genus: Asactopholis; Brenske, 1894

Synonyms
- Empectida Moser, 1914

Genus of leaf beetles

Asactopholis is a genus of beetles belonging to the family Scarabaeidae.

== Species ==
- Asactopholis bicolor (Sharp, 1876)
- Asactopholis bicuspis Frey, 1970
- Asactopholis capucina (Fairmaire, 1893)
- Asactopholis gracilipes (Sharp, 1876)
- Asactopholis laticeps Moser, 1908
- Asactopholis marmorata (Sharp, 1881)
- Asactopholis masumotoi Matsumoto, 2011
- Asactopholis microsquamosa (Frey, 1972)
- Asactopholis miranda (Sharp, 1881)
- Asactopholis nigrimargo Prokofiev, 2015
- Asactopholis opalinea (Burmeister, 1855)
- Asactopholis ornata (Brenske, 1892)
- Asactopholis pectoralis Moser, 1908
- Asactopholis sericea Moser, 1913
- Asactopholis squamigera (Moser, 1914)
- Asactopholis squamipennis (Burmeister, 1855)
- Asactopholis tonkinensis (Moser, 1914)
- Asactopholis vethi (Moser, 1914)
- Asactopholis xanthosquamosa (Keith, 2008)
