= Asactopholis squamigera =

Scientific classification
- Kingdom: Animalia
- Phylum: Arthropoda
- Clade: Pancrustacea
- Class: Insecta
- Order: Coleoptera
- Suborder: Polyphaga
- Infraorder: Scarabaeiformia
- Family: Scarabaeidae
- Genus: Asactopholis
- Species: A. squamigera

Binomial name
- Asactopholis squamigera (Moser, 1914)

Synonyms
- Empectida squamigera Moser, 1914

Species of beetle

Asactopholis squamigera is a species of beetle of the family Scarabaeidae. It is found in Singapore.

== Description ==
Adults reach a length of about 12 mm (0.47 in). They are similar to Asactopholis vethi, but differs in its ten-segmented antennae and the different shape of its scales. The head is wrinkled and bears elongated scales and the anterior margin of the clypeus is not emarginate. The pronotum is similar in shape to that of vethi, but slightly shorter. The upper surface is wrinkled and somewhat irregularly punctate. The scales of the punctures are ovate, wider on the sides of the pronotum than in the middle. The scutellum, with the exception of an indistinct median line, is covered with ovate scales that are wider than those of vethi. The elytra bear scales that become narrower before the posterior margin and are also of varying sizes. The pygidium is longer than wide, narrowing slightly posteriorly, with a rounded posterior margin. The egg-shaped scales on the pygidium are not of uniform size. The underside of the chest is quite extensively scaled, with sparse hairs between the scales on the sides.
