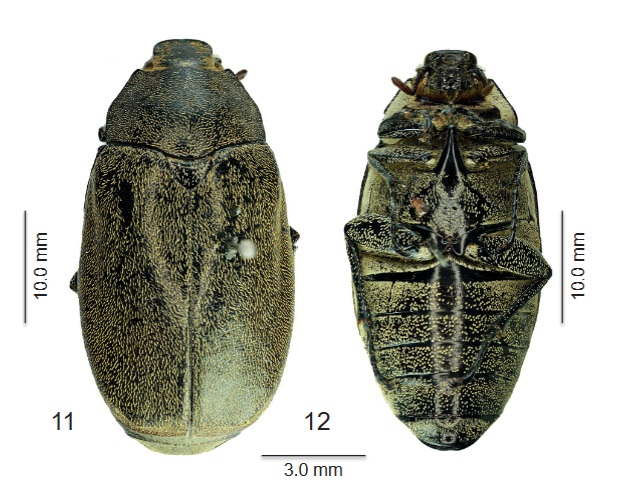

Scientific classification
- Kingdom: Animalia
- Phylum: Arthropoda
- Clade: Pancrustacea
- Class: Insecta
- Order: Coleoptera
- Suborder: Polyphaga
- Infraorder: Scarabaeiformia
- Family: Scarabaeidae
- Tribe: Melolonthini
- Genus: Leucopholis
- Species: L. semperi

Binomial name
- Leucopholis semperi Brenske, 1896

= Leucopholis semperi =

Species of beetle

Leucopholis semperi is a species of beetle of the family Scarabaeidae. It is found in the Philippines (Visayas, Mindanao).

== Description ==
Adults reach a length of about 36 mm. The dorsum is monochromatic blackish and the head, pronotum, scutellum, elytra and legs are blackish, covered with yellowish white scales. The venter is blackish, covered with whitish scales.
