= Asthenopholis =

Scientific classification
- Kingdom: Animalia
- Phylum: Arthropoda
- Clade: Pancrustacea
- Class: Insecta
- Order: Coleoptera
- Suborder: Polyphaga
- Infraorder: Scarabaeiformia
- Family: Scarabaeidae
- Subfamily: Melolonthinae
- Tribe: Leucopholini
- Genus: Asthenopholis; Brenske, 1898

Genus of leaf beetles

Asthenopholis is a genus of beetles belonging to the family Scarabaeidae.

== Species ==
- Asthenopholis adspersa (Boheman, 1857)
- Asthenopholis crassa Arrow, 1902
- Asthenopholis crypsis Harrison, 2009
- Asthenopholis minor Brenske, 1898
- Asthenopholis rex Harrison, 2009
- Asthenopholis subfasciata (Blanchard, 1851)
- Asthenopholis ugandensis Moser, 1913
