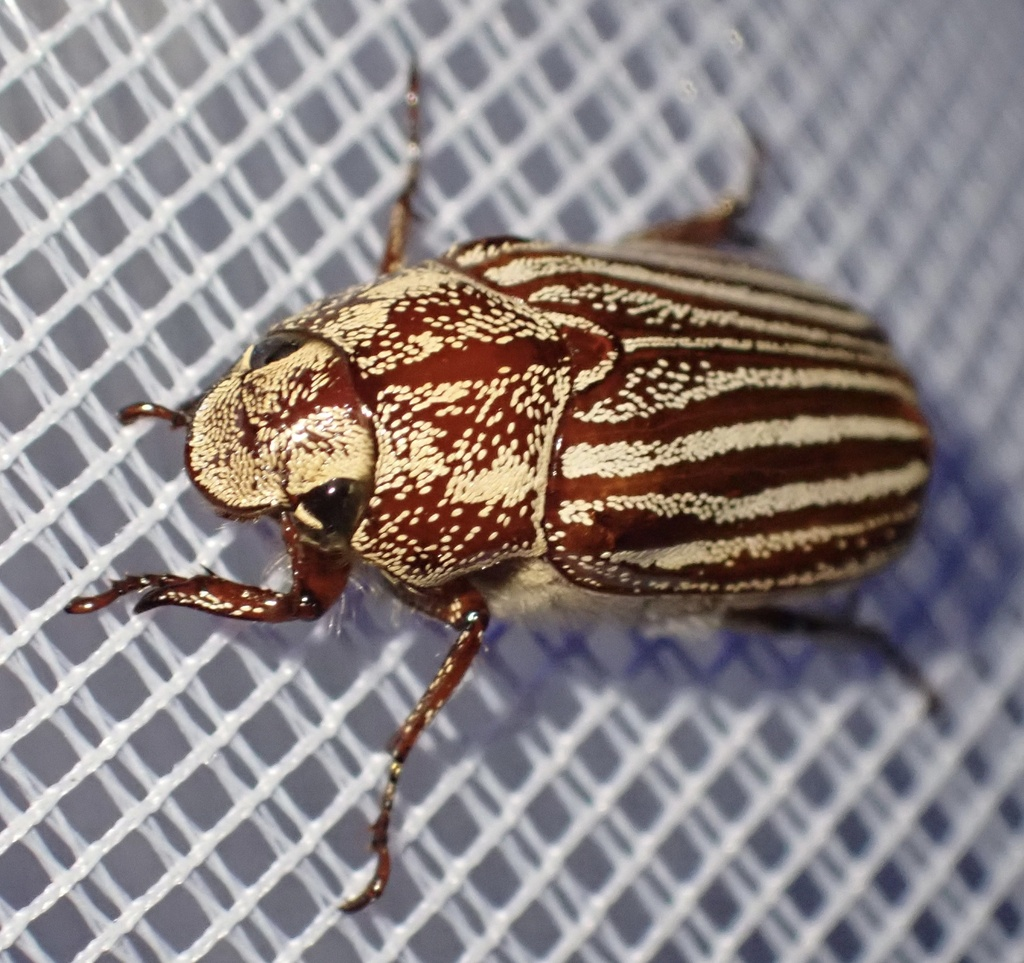

Scientific classification
- Kingdom: Animalia
- Phylum: Arthropoda
- Clade: Pancrustacea
- Class: Insecta
- Order: Coleoptera
- Suborder: Polyphaga
- Infraorder: Scarabaeiformia
- Family: Scarabaeidae
- Genus: Engertia
- Species: E. amboinae

Binomial name
- Engertia amboinae (Brenske, 1897)

Synonyms
- Phila amboinae Brenske, 1897; Engertia allolepis Prokofiev, 2019; Phila papuana Moser, 1913

= Engertia amboinae =

Species of beetle

Engertia amboinae is a species of beetle of the family Scarabaeidae. It is found in Indonesia (Ambon) and Papua New Guinea.

== Description ==
Adults reach a length of about 18 mm (0.71 in). They are black, the head and the penultimate abdominal segment shimmer brownish, and the legs and antennae are brown. On the pygidium, the scales are quite dense and oval in shape. There is pubescence only before the posterior margin. The thorax is densely covered with greyish-yellow hairs, the abdomen widely covered in the middle, more densely covered laterally with ovate scales.

== Taxonomy ==
The species differs greatly in size, shape and colour of the scales, which had led to a number of new species descriptions. These were later found to be variations in just one population of the same species.
