= Pholidochris sororia =

Scientific classification
- Kingdom: Animalia
- Phylum: Arthropoda
- Clade: Pancrustacea
- Class: Insecta
- Order: Coleoptera
- Suborder: Polyphaga
- Infraorder: Scarabaeiformia
- Family: Scarabaeidae
- Genus: Pholidochris
- Species: P. sororia

Binomial name
- Pholidochris sororia Moser, 1914

Species of beetle

Pholidochris sororia is a species of beetle of the family Scarabaeidae. It is found in Tanzania.

== Description ==
Adults reach a length of about 35 mm (1.4 in). They are similar to Pholidochris quedenfeldti, but the head is not finely shagreened, but rather extensively covered with strong punctures, more densely spaced next to the eyes. The anterior margin of the clypeus is upturned and barely curved. The pronotum is much more finely shagreened than in quedenfeldti and bears sparsely spaced coarse punctures across its entire surface. The scutellum is weakly wrinkled, densely punctured at the sides and more widely spaced in the middle. On the elytra, the punctures are equally spaced, but the interspaces between the punctures are much smoother in sororia. There are also hardly any indications of ribs. The punctation is somewhat closer together on the pygidium, as it is on the abdomen, particularly on the first segment and on the sides.
