= Cyphochilus insulanus =

Scientific classification
- Kingdom: Animalia
- Phylum: Arthropoda
- Clade: Pancrustacea
- Class: Insecta
- Order: Coleoptera
- Suborder: Polyphaga
- Infraorder: Scarabaeiformia
- Family: Scarabaeidae
- Genus: Cyphochilus
- Species: C. insulanus

Binomial name
- Cyphochilus insulanus Moser, 1918

Species of beetle

Cyphochilus insulanus is a species of beetle of the family Scarabaeidae. It is found in Taiwan.

== Description ==
Adults reach a length of about 25–30 mm. They are very similar to Cyphochilus tonkinensis. The species is of the same shape and likewise densely covered on the upper side with white, egg-shaped scales. The difference between the male specimens of both species is that insulanus lacks the longitudinal impression in the middle of the last abdominal segment. Furthermore, the pygidium is somewhat more pointed and more strongly projecting. The female specimens of both species differ in insulanus, the pygidium lacks the point before the posterior margin.
