= Engertia setifera =

Scientific classification
- Kingdom: Animalia
- Phylum: Arthropoda
- Clade: Pancrustacea
- Class: Insecta
- Order: Coleoptera
- Suborder: Polyphaga
- Infraorder: Scarabaeiformia
- Family: Scarabaeidae
- Genus: Engertia
- Species: E. setifera

Binomial name
- Engertia setifera (Moser, 1913)

Synonyms
- Phila setifera Moser, 1913; Engertia germanica Prokofiev, 2016

Species of beetle

Engertia setifera is a species of beetle of the family Scarabaeidae. It is found in Indonesia (Seram, Saparua).

== Description ==
Adults reach a length of about 18 mm (0.71 in). They are usually chestnut brown, but sometimes black with a purple hue. There are minute brownish-yellow or sometimes white scales on the upper surface.
