= Asthenopholis crassa =

Scientific classification
- Kingdom: Animalia
- Phylum: Arthropoda
- Clade: Pancrustacea
- Class: Insecta
- Order: Coleoptera
- Suborder: Polyphaga
- Infraorder: Scarabaeiformia
- Family: Scarabaeidae
- Genus: Asthenopholis
- Species: A. crassa

Binomial name
- Asthenopholis crassa Arrow, 1902

Species of beetle

Asthenopholis crassa is a species of beetle of the family Scarabaeidae. It is found in Kenya and Tanzania.

== Description ==
Adults reach a length of about 22–25 mm (0.87–0.98 in) for males and 24–27 mm (0.94–1.06 in) for females. They are dark brown to black with a covering of off-white scales. There are pointed yellow scales on the pronotum and elytra, while the scutellum is without setae or scales.
