= Philacelota maculosa =

Scientific classification
- Kingdom: Animalia
- Phylum: Arthropoda
- Clade: Pancrustacea
- Class: Insecta
- Order: Coleoptera
- Suborder: Polyphaga
- Infraorder: Scarabaeiformia
- Family: Scarabaeidae
- Genus: Philacelota
- Species: P. maculosa

Binomial name
- Philacelota maculosa (Brenske, 1896)

Synonyms
- Schoenherria maculosa Brenske, 1896; Philacelota submaculata Heller, 1900

Species of beetle

Philacelota maculosa is a species of beetle of the family Scarabaeidae. It is found in Indonesia (Sulawesi). The type locality Ceylon (Sri Lanka) appears to be erroneous.

== Description ==
Adults reach a length of about 21 mm (0.83 in). The clypeus is semicircular, coarsely wrinkled, lanceolate and scaled and the frons is also very coarsely wrinkled and scaled, with the vertex smooth. The pronotum is almost equally wide, very slightly rounded at the sides, the anterior angles only slightly projecting, the posterior angles not curved, the middle is smoothly raised, the remaining surface coarsely wrinkled and punctate, with smaller smooth spots in between, and lanceolate scales within the punctures. The scutellum is entirely scaled. The elytra are weakly striate, the ribs are smooth, very sparsely covered with individual scales, the intervals partly smooth, partly scaled. There are patches on the elytra, and especially those before the apex, give the impression of transverse bands. The scales are oblong-ovate. The pygidium is narrow, covered with short oval scales, sparsely pubescent at the apex, and with a smooth longitudinal stripe in the middle. The abdomen is more sparsely scaled, and the scales are somewhat rounder than those of the pygidium. The sides are smooth with white scale patches.
