= Pholidochris sjoestedti =

Scientific classification
- Kingdom: Animalia
- Phylum: Arthropoda
- Clade: Pancrustacea
- Class: Insecta
- Order: Coleoptera
- Suborder: Polyphaga
- Infraorder: Scarabaeiformia
- Family: Scarabaeidae
- Genus: Pholidochris
- Species: P. sjoestedti

Binomial name
- Pholidochris sjoestedti Brenske, 1903

Species of beetle

Pholidochris sjoestedti is a species of beetle of the family Scarabaeidae. It is found in Cameroon and Gabon.

== Description ==
Adults reach a length of about 29 mm (1.1 in). They are dark chestnut-brown, with the head, pronotum and scutellum blackish and dull. The elytra have a pruinose bloom.
