= Afrolepis unguicularis =

Scientific classification
- Kingdom: Animalia
- Phylum: Arthropoda
- Clade: Pancrustacea
- Class: Insecta
- Order: Coleoptera
- Suborder: Polyphaga
- Infraorder: Scarabaeiformia
- Family: Scarabaeidae
- Genus: Afrolepis
- Species: A. unguicularis

Binomial name
- Afrolepis unguicularis (Brenske, 1903)

Synonyms
- Oligolepis unguicularis Brenske, 1903

Species of beetle

Afrolepis unguicularis is a species of beetle of the family Scarabaeidae. It is found in Cameroon and Gabon.

== Description ==
Adults reach a length of about 19 mm (0.75 in). They are reddish-brown and velvety, with a darker head, pronotum, and scutellum and with yellowish scales and hairs.
