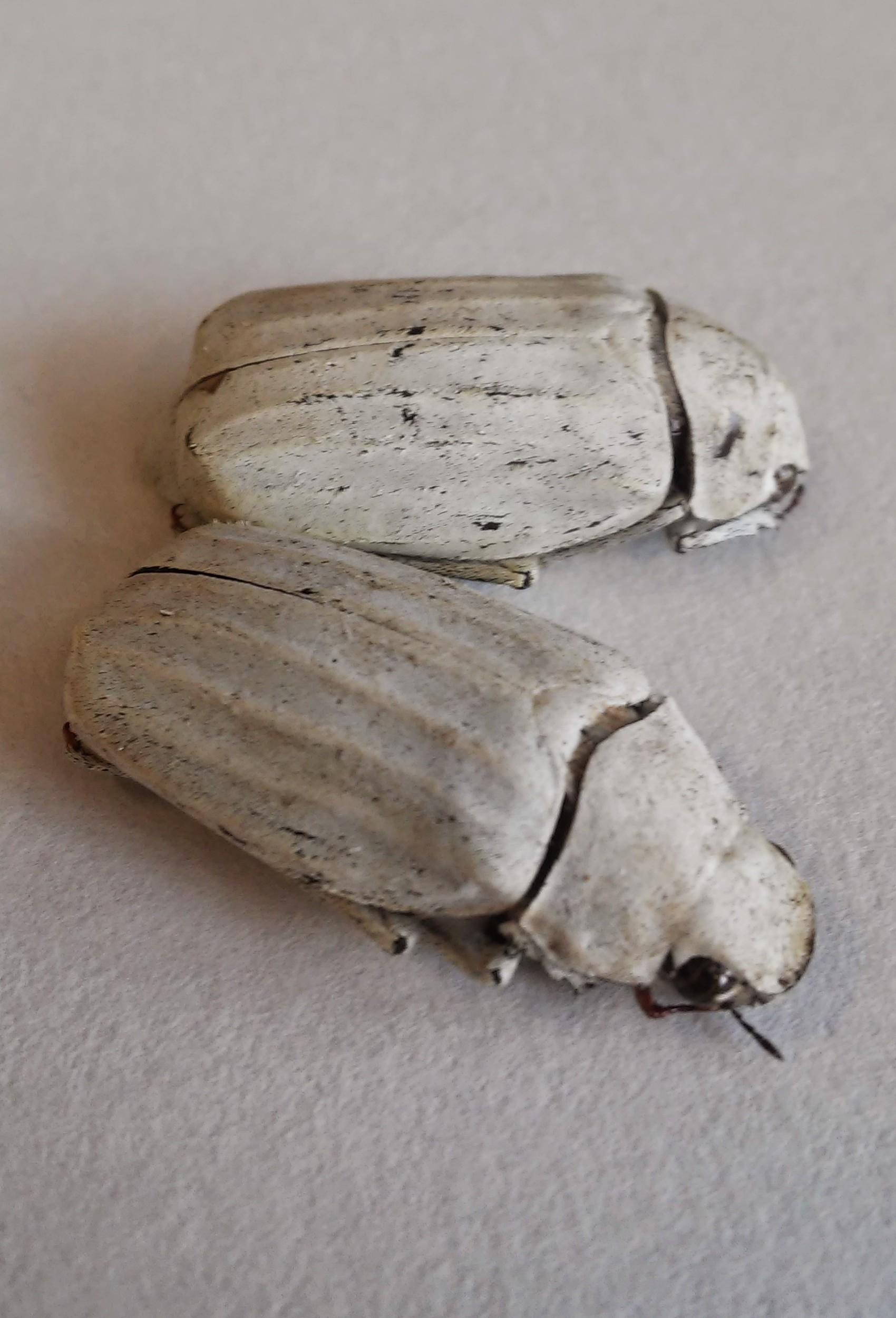
- Two Cyphochilus beetles on a white background

Scientific classification
- Kingdom: Animalia
- Phylum: Arthropoda
- Clade: Pancrustacea
- Class: Insecta
- Order: Coleoptera
- Suborder: Polyphaga
- Infraorder: Scarabaeiformia
- Family: Scarabaeidae
- Tribe: Leucopholini
- Genus: Cyphochilus; Waterhouse, 1867

Species
- Cyphochilus apicalis Cyphochilus candidus Cyphochilus carinchebanus Cyphochilus costulatus Cyphochilus crataceus Cyphochilus cylindricus Cyphochilus elongatus Cyphochilus farinosus Cyphochilus feae Cyphochilus flavomarginatus Cyphochilus insulanus Cyphochilus latus Cyphochilus manipurensis Cyphochilus marginalis Cyphochilus niveosquamosus Cyphochilus oberthuri Cyphochilus obscurus Cyphochilus ochraceus Cyphochilus peninsularis Cyphochilus podicalis Cyphochilus proximus Cyphochilus pygidialis Cyphochilus testaceipes Cyphochilus tonkinensis Cyphochilus tricolor Cyphochilus unidentatus Cyphochilus ventriglaber Cyphochilus ventritectus Cyphochilus vestitus Cyphochilus waterhousei

= Cyphochilus =

Genus of beetles

Cyphochilus is a genus of beetles with unusually bright white scales that cover the whole exoskeleton. Cyphochilus inhabit Southeast Asia.

== Etymology ==
Probably the same etymology as the former Cyphochilus orchid: from the Greek kyphos meaning "bent" and cheilos meaning "lip", because of the reflexed lip.

== External morphology ==
A strongly asymmetric labrum sets Cyphochilus apart from all other members in its superfamily. Some distinguishing traits by species include 10-segmented antennae, the upper part of the body only covered in scales, and strongly asymmetric paramere.

The whiteness of the scales is caused by a thin disordered photonic structure (≈7 μm) which scatters light of all wavelengths with the same efficiency, thus resulting in a white colouration. This is particularly interesting as the beetle's exoskeleton underneath the scales is black, meaning that the scattering events must be very efficient in order to achieve such high opacity.

The white scales are composed of sclerotin, a modified form of the polymer chitin, and are whiter than paper or any artificial material produced as of 2022. That is they have a scattering mean free path shorter than any natural material thanks to the anisotropy in the spatial architecture of the fibres, which ensures a high packing efficiency whilst preventing optical crowding.

== Ecology ==
The beetles are believed to have developed white coloration to camouflage themselves among white fungi. The chitin filaments are just a few micrometres thick – far thinner than a very fine sheet of paper. The elements are tightly packed, scattering light efficiently, but still able to keep a degree of disorder in their shape. It has been shown how this strategy is evolutionarily optimised to produce bright whiteness despite the low refractive index of sclerotin.

== Inspired materials ==
Scientists have exploited the topology of the random network to fabricate materials of comparable performance for application as ultra-white paints and coatings. For instance, in 2018 Syurik et al. have developed a bioinspired PMMA-based material that scatters light efficiently and is flexible and switchable in appearance.

Another recent example consists of the use of cellulose nanofibrils to fabricate ultra-white paper for cosmetics and coatings. Or ceramic for tiles.

In 2023 a durable alumina-based ceramic based on Cyphochilus achieved a solar reflectivity of 99.6%, a record high, along with infrared thermal emission of 96.5%. It tolerates ultraviolet light and increases water evaporation and withstands temperatures of over 1,000 °C.

Finally, the researchers also say that the material can be easily mass produced, using common materials like alumina and a two-step process of phase inversion and sintering. And if white is too boring for some houses, the material can apparently be produced in other colors and patterns by adding extra layers.
