= Byrsalepis mikindana =

Scientific classification
- Kingdom: Animalia
- Phylum: Arthropoda
- Clade: Pancrustacea
- Class: Insecta
- Order: Coleoptera
- Suborder: Polyphaga
- Infraorder: Scarabaeiformia
- Family: Scarabaeidae
- Genus: Byrsalepis
- Species: B. mikindana

Binomial name
- Byrsalepis mikindana Brenske, 1898

Species of beetle

Byrsalepis mikindana is a species of beetle of the family Scarabaeidae. It is found in Mozambique and Tanzania.

== Description ==
Adults reach a length of about 17 mm (0.67 in). They are brownish-red, darker above with an impure hue, and faintly silky. The clypeus is almost rounded, densely covered with scales and hairs and the forehead and vertex are similarly covered, the punctures not coarse. The pronotum is almost rectangular, the sides very projecting in the middle, narrowing only slightly posteriorly. The anterior and posterior angles not projecting. The surface is densely covered with fine scales, which become more hair-like towards the middle, yet the ground colour shows through everywhere. The middle is slightly raised lengthwise, smooth and free of scales, covered only with scattered hairs. The scutellum is heart-shaped, smooth with a few fine scales. The elytra are widened posteriorly and the suture is distinct. There are three very finely indicated ribs, and between them are bare, somewhat raised, scale-free spots and somewhat lower-lying, finely scaled ones. The scales are small and oval in shape. The entire underside is fairly uniformly densely and finely scaled. The ground colour shows through everywhere.
