= Asthenopholis minor =

Scientific classification
- Kingdom: Animalia
- Phylum: Arthropoda
- Clade: Pancrustacea
- Class: Insecta
- Order: Coleoptera
- Suborder: Polyphaga
- Infraorder: Scarabaeiformia
- Family: Scarabaeidae
- Genus: Asthenopholis
- Species: A. minor

Binomial name
- Asthenopholis minor Brenske, 1898

Species of beetle

Asthenopholis minor is a species of beetle of the family Scarabaeidae. It is found in South Africa (KwaZulu-Natal, Mpumalanga, Limpopo, Eastern Cape), Lesotho and Eswatini.

== Description ==
Adults reach a length of about 14.5–18 mm (0.57–0.71 in) for males and 14–19 mm (0.55–0.75 in) for females. The head, thorax and scutellum are black and the elytra are reddish brown. There are fine, white scales on the thorax, scutellum and elytra.
