= Chaetocosmetes javanus =

Scientific classification
- Kingdom: Animalia
- Phylum: Arthropoda
- Clade: Pancrustacea
- Class: Insecta
- Order: Coleoptera
- Suborder: Polyphaga
- Infraorder: Scarabaeiformia
- Family: Scarabaeidae
- Genus: Chaetocosmetes
- Species: C. javanus

Binomial name
- Chaetocosmetes javanus Moser, 1917

Species of beetle

Chaetocosmetes javanus is a species of beetle of the family Scarabaeidae. It is found in Indonesia (Java).

== Description ==
Adults reach a length of about 9 mm (0.35 in). They are brown and glossy, with the upper surface wrinkled and punctate throughout, the punctures bearing yellow setae of varying lengths. The clypeus is somewhat broadened anteriorly, the anterior angles are deeply emarginate, and the middle of the clypeus is very deeply emarginate, revealing the labrum. The pygidium is covered with large punctures and in the middle is a puncture-free patch. The underside and legs are quite densely punctate, the punctures bearing hair-like setae.
