= Eulepida mashona =

Scientific classification
- Kingdom: Animalia
- Phylum: Arthropoda
- Clade: Pancrustacea
- Class: Insecta
- Order: Coleoptera
- Suborder: Polyphaga
- Infraorder: Scarabaeiformia
- Family: Scarabaeidae
- Genus: Eulepida
- Species: E. mashona

Binomial name
- Eulepida mashona Arrow, 1902

Species of beetle

Eulepida mashona is a species of beetle of the family Scarabaeidae. It is found in Zimbabwe.

== Description ==
Adults reach a length of about 25–29 mm (0.98–1.14 in). They are dark chestnut-brown, with the legs and underside piceous. The club of the antennae and palpi are reddish-brown. They are covered with flavescent, elongated, contiguous scales, hiding completely the background, but the pectus is clothed with a short, dense, appressed pubescence, and the scales on the abdomen are whiter than on the upper side.
